The Sacramento Kings is an American professional basketball team based in Sacramento, California. They play in the Pacific Division of the Western Conference in the National Basketball Association (NBA). They began as the Rochester Royals (based in Rochester, New York) in the Basketball Association of America (forerunner of the NBA) in 1948. The Royals moved to Cincinnati, Ohio in 1957. In 1972, the team moved again, to a primary home in Kansas City, Missouri (and a secondary home in Omaha, Nebraska) and were renamed as the Kansas City-Omaha Kings. The Kings moved to its current home in Sacramento, California in 1985.

This article is a list of players, both past and present, who have appeared at least in one game.
 


Players
Note: Statistics are correct through the end of the  season.

A

|-
|align="left"| || align="center"|F/C || align="left"|Duke || align="center"|1 || align="center"| || 51 || 476 || 106 || 13 || 254 || 9.3 || 2.1 || 0.3 || 5.0 || align=center|
|-
|align="left"| || align="center"|F/C || align="left"|Iowa State || align="center"|1 || align="center"| || 20 || 108 || 31 || 4 || 38 || 5.4 || 1.6 || 0.2 || 1.9 || align=center|
|-
|align="left"| || align="center"|G || align="left"|LSU || align="center"|2 || align="center"|– || 106 || 2,661 || 159 || 247 || 1,258 || 25.1 || 1.5 || 2.3 || 11.9 || align=center|
|-
|align="left"| || align="center"|F || align="left"|San Jose State || align="center"|2 || align="center"|– || 108 || 2,164 || 302 || 101 || 830 || 20.0 || 2.8 || 0.9 || 7.7 || align=center|
|-
|align="left"| || align="center"|F || align="left"|California || align="center"|3 || align="center"|– || 158 || 4,027 || 765 || 262 || 1,690 || 25.5 || 4.8 || 1.7 || 10.7 || align=center|
|-
|align="left"| || align="center"|F/C || align="left"|Baylor || align="center"|2 || align="center"| || 115 || 1,662 || 389 || 51 || 459 || 14.5 || 3.4 || 0.4 || 4.0 || align=center|
|-
|align="left"| || align="center"|G || align="left"|Boston College || align="center"|1 || align="center"| || 18 || 139 || 6 || 22 || 40 || 7.7 || 0.3 || 1.2 || 2.2 || align=center|
|-
|align="left"| || align="center"|G || align="left"|Loyola Marymount || align="center"|1 || align="center"| || 18 || 121 || 14 || 8 || 30 || 6.7 || 0.8 || 0.4 || 1.7 || align=center|
|-
|align="left"| || align="center"|G/F || align="left"|UCLA || align="center"|1 || align="center"| || 61 || 1,580 || 125 || 78 || 515 || 25.9 || 2.0 || 1.3 || 8.4 || align=center|
|-
|align="left"| || align="center"|G || align="left"|BYU || align="center"|2 || align="center"|– || 103 || 3,755 || 427 || 640 || 1,909 || 36.5 || 4.1 || 6.2 || 18.5 || align=center|
|-
|align="left"| || align="center"|C || align="left"|Kansas || align="center"|1 || align="center"| || 15 || 175 || 63 || 3 || 50 || 11.7 || 4.2 || 0.2 || 3.3 || align=center|
|-
|align="left"| || align="center"|G || align="left"|UCLA || align="center"|2 || align="center"|– || 108 || 2,560 || 275 || 404 || 1,077 || 23.7 || 2.5 || 3.7 || 10.0 || align=center|
|-
|align="left"| || align="center"|F || align="left"|Florida State || align="center"|2 || align="center"|– || 70 || 789 || 145 || 23 || 252 || 11.3 || 2.1 || 0.3 || 3.6 || align=center|
|-
|align="left"| || align="center"|C || align="left"|Liberty || align="center"|1 || align="center"| || 2 || 5 || 2 || 0 || 2 || 2.5 || 1.0 || 0.0 || 1.0 || align=center|
|-
|align="left"| || align="center"|G/F || align="left"|Oklahoma State || align="center"|1 || align="center"| || 51 || 721 || 86 || 41 || 179 || 14.1 || 1.7 || 0.8 || 3.5 || align=center|
|-
|align="left"| || align="center"|G/F || align="left"|Illinois || align="center"|2 || align="center"|– || 93 || 2,263 || 364 || 136 || 819 || 24.3 || 3.9 || 1.5 || 8.8 || align=center|
|-
|align="left"| || align="center"|F/C || align="left"|Creighton || align="center"|1 || align="center"| || 44 || 370 || 82 || 9 || 159 || 8.4 || 1.9 || 0.2 || 3.6 || align=center|
|-
|align="left" bgcolor="#FFFF99"|^ (#1) || align="center"|G || align="left"|UTEP || align="center"|6 || align="center"|– || 433 || 17,520 || 1,207 || 3,499 || 10,894 || 40.5 || 2.8 || 8.1 || 25.2 || align=center|
|-
|align="left"| || align="center"|F || align="left"|Niagara || align="center"|1 || align="center"| || 9 || 85 || 13 || 8 || 34 || 9.4 || 1.4 || 0.9 || 3.8 || align=center|
|-
|align="left"| || align="center"|F/C || align="left"|UConn || align="center"|1 || align="center"| || 6 || 56 || 14 || 2 || 10 || 9.3 || 2.3 || 0.3 || 1.7 || align=center|
|-
|align="left"| || align="center"|G || align="left"|Texas || align="center"|3 || align="center"|– || 114 || 1,177 || 116 || 139 || 424 || 10.3 || 1.0 || 1.2 || 3.7 || align=center|
|-
|align="left"| || align="center"|F || align="left"|Notre Dame || align="center"|1 || align="center"| || 55 || 594 || 152 || 24 || 301 || 10.8 || 2.8 || 0.4 || 5.5 || align=center|
|-
|align="left"| || align="center"|F || align="left"|St. John's || align="center"|3 || align="center"|– || 167 || 6,417 || 990 || 602 || 3,158 || 38.4 || 5.9 || 3.6 || 18.9 || align=center|
|-
|align="left"| || align="center"|G/F || align="left"|Memphis || align="center"|1 || align="center"| || 9 || 76 || 11 || 5 || 27 || 8.4 || 1.2 || 0.6 || 3.0 || align=center|
|}

B

|-
|align="left" bgcolor="#CCFFCC"|x || align="center"|F || align="left"|Duke || align="center"|1 || align="center"| || 62 || 1,567 || 471 || 62 || 923 || 25.3 || 7.6 || 1.0 || 14.9 || align=center|
|-
|align="left" bgcolor="#CCFFCC"|x || align="center"|F || align="left"|North Carolina || align="center"|1 || align="center"| || 28 || 949 || 154 || 53 || 399 || 33.9 || 5.5 || 1.9 || 14.3 || align=center|
|-
|align="left"| || align="center"|F || align="left"|UCLA || align="center"|2 || align="center"| || 97 || 2,082 || 426 || 207 || 577 || 21.5 || 4.4 || 2.1 || 5.9 || align=center|
|-
|align="left"| || align="center"|G || align="left"|Duquesne || align="center"|1 || align="center"| || 73 || 1,224 || 130 || 175 || 285 || 16.8 || 1.8 || 2.4 || 3.9 || align=center|
|-
|align="left"| || align="center"|G || align="left"|Duquesne || align="center"|1 || align="center"| || 31 || 145 || 20 || 28 || 61 || 4.7 || 0.6 || 0.9 || 2.0 || align=center|
|-
|align="left"| || align="center"|G || align="left"|Georgia Tech || align="center"|3 || align="center"|– || 167 || 3,027 || 349 || 392 || 1,024 || 18.1 || 2.1 || 2.3 || 6.1 || align=center|
|-
|align="left"| || align="center"|F/C || align="left"|Minnesota || align="center"|3 || align="center"|– || 170 || 4,390 || 1,190 || 292 || 1,795 || 25.8 || 7.0 || 1.7 || 10.6 || align=center|
|-
|align="left"| || align="center"|G/F || align="left"|Italy || align="center"|1 || align="center"| || 68 || 1,672 || 117 || 127 || 696 || 24.6 || 1.7 || 1.9 || 10.2 || align=center|
|-
|align="left"| || align="center"|F || align="left"|San Jose State || align="center"|1 || align="center"| || 64 || 1,406 || 197 || 80 || 706 || 22.0 || 3.1 || 1.3 || 11.0 || align=center|
|-
|align="left"| || align="center"|C || align="left"|New Mexico State || align="center"|1 || align="center"| || 3 || 3 || 1 || 1 || 2 || 1.0 || 0.3 || 0.3 || 0.7 || align=center|
|-
|align="left"| || align="center"|G || align="left"|Arizona || align="center"|7 || align="center"|– || 476 || 16,982 || 1,537 || 2,580 || 8,384 || 35.7 || 3.2 || 5.4 || 17.6 || align=center|
|-
|align="left"| || align="center"|G/F || align="left"|Penn || align="center"|3 || align="center"|– || 61 || 332 || 61 || 17 || 143 || 5.4 || 1.0 || 0.3 || 2.3 || align=center|
|-
|align="left" bgcolor="#FFCC00"|+ || align="center"|G || align="left"|Houston || align="center"|4 || align="center"|– || 308 || 10,195 || 1,118 || 890 || 6,539 || 33.1 || 3.6 || 2.9 || 21.2 || align=center|
|-
|align="left" bgcolor="#CCFFCC"|x || align="center"|F || align="left"|Serbia || align="center"|1 || align="center"| || 77 || 1,788 || 444 || 147 || 741 || 23.2 || 5.8 || 1.9 || 9.6 || align=center|
|-
|align="left"| || align="center"|C || align="left"|South Dakota State || align="center"|1 || align="center"| || 16 || 100 || 34 || 2 || 26 || 6.3 || 2.1 || 0.1 || 1.6 || align=center|
|-
|align="left"| || align="center"|F/C || align="left"|USC || align="center"|2 || align="center"|– || 107 || 2,260 || 509 || 113 || 938 || 21.1 || 4.8 || 1.1 || 8.8 || align=center|
|-
|align="left"| || align="center"|G || align="left"|Dayton || align="center"|7 || align="center"|– || 474 || 14,791 || 2,234 || 1,645 || 5,430 || 31.2 || 4.7 || 3.5 || 11.5 || align=center|
|-
|align="left" bgcolor="#CCFFCC"|x || align="center"|G || align="left"|Serbia || align="center"|2 || align="center"|– || 148 || 4,122 || 466 || 525 || 1,907 || 27.9 || 3.1 || 3.5 || 12.9 || align=center|
|-
|align="left"| || align="center"|F || align="left"|Saint Louis || align="center"|3 || align="center"|– || 183 || 4,801 || 1,101 || 270 || 1,591 || 26.2 || 6.0 || 1.5 || 8.7 || align=center|
|-
|align="left"| || align="center"|G/F || align="left"|Idaho State || align="center"|2 || align="center"|– || 164 || 5,674 || 590 || 649 || 3,266 || 34.6 || 3.6 || 4.0 || 19.9 || align=center|
|-
|align="left"| || align="center"|C || align="left"|Penn State || align="center"|1 || align="center"| || 7 || 55 || 10 || 0 || 16 || 7.9 || 1.4 || 0.0 || 2.3 || align=center|
|-
|align="left"| || align="center"|F || align="left"|Kansas State || align="center"|4 || align="center"|– || 269 || 7,276 || 2,348 || 374 || 3,233 || 27.0 || 8.7 || 1.4 || 12.0 || align=center|
|-
|align="left"| || align="center"|F/C || align="left"|Villanova || align="center"|1 || align="center"| || 8 || 48 || 11 || 2 || 18 || 6.0 || 1.4 || 0.3 || 2.3 || align=center|
|-
|align="left"| || align="center"|G || align="left"|Stanford || align="center"|1 || align="center"| || 33 || 269 || 23 || 39 || 70 || 8.2 || 0.7 || 1.2 || 2.1 || align=center|
|-
|align="left"| || align="center"|C || align="left"|Minnesota || align="center"|1 || align="center"| || 26 || 247 || 56 || 8 || 19 || 9.5 || 2.2 || 0.3 || 0.7 || align=center|
|-
|align="left"| || align="center"|G/F || align="left"|Florida || align="center"|1 || align="center"| || 24 || 352 || 59 || 29 || 98 || 14.7 || 2.5 || 1.2 || 4.1 || align=center|
|-
|align="left"| || align="center"|F || align="left"|Washington || align="center"|1 || align="center"| || 52 || 654 || 213 || 22 || 147 || 12.6 || 4.1 || 0.4 || 2.8 || align=center|
|-
|align="left"| || align="center"|G/F || align="left"|West Texas A&M || align="center"|1 || align="center"| || 7 ||  ||  || 1 || 34 ||  ||  || 0.1 || 4.9 || align=center|
|-
|align="left"| || align="center"|G || align="left"|Oregon || align="center"|1 || align="center"| || 46 || 959 || 78 || 108 || 366 || 20.8 || 1.7 || 2.3 || 8.0 || align=center|
|-
|align="left"| || align="center"|G || align="left"|Cal State Fullerton || align="center"|1 || align="center"| || 47 || 675 || 36 || 87 || 245 || 14.4 || 0.8 || 1.9 || 5.2 || align=center|
|-
|align="left"| || align="center"|F || align="left"|NC State || align="center"|1 || align="center"| || 18 || 92 || 33 || 6 || 21 || 5.1 || 1.8 || 0.3 || 1.2 || align=center|
|-
|align="left"| || align="center"|G || align="left"|New Mexico State || align="center"|4 || align="center"|– || 259 || 4,388 || 501 || 521 || 1,349 || 16.9 || 1.9 || 2.0 || 5.2 || align=center|
|-
|align="left"| || align="center"|F || align="left"|Tennessee State || align="center"|2 || align="center"|– || 65 || 740 || 265 || 43 || 375 || 11.4 || 4.1 || 0.7 || 5.8 || align=center|
|-
|align="left"| || align="center"|G/F || align="left"|Creighton || align="center"|1 || align="center"| || 22 || 141 || 15 || 7 || 41 || 6.4 || 0.7 || 0.3 || 1.9 || align=center|
|-
|align="left"| || align="center"|G || align="left"|Colorado || align="center"|1 || align="center"| || 13 || 127 || 22 || 10 || 22 || 9.8 || 1.7 || 0.8 || 1.7 || align=center|
|-
|align="left"| || align="center"|C || align="left"|NC State || align="center"|3 || align="center"|– || 169 || 2,724 || 835 || 201 || 1,183 || 16.1 || 4.9 || 1.2 || 7.0 || align=center|
|-
|align="left"| || align="center"|F || align="left"|Maryland || align="center"|1 || align="center"| || 23 || 143 || 30 || 9 || 56 || 6.2 || 1.3 || 0.4 || 2.4 || align=center|
|-
|align="left"| || align="center"|F/C || align="left"|Kentucky || align="center"|1 || align="center"| || 67 || 1,028 || 293 || 41 || 404 || 15.3 || 4.4 || 0.6 || 6.0 || align=center|
|-
|align="left"| || align="center"|G || align="left"|Evansville || align="center"|2 || align="center"|– || 141 || 2,266 || 177 || 506 || 599 || 16.1 || 1.3 || 3.6 || 4.2 || align=center|
|-
|align="left"| || align="center"|F || align="left"|UConn || align="center"|1 || align="center"| || 17 || 176 || 22 || 10 || 63 || 10.4 || 1.3 || 0.6 || 3.7 || align=center|
|}

C

|-
|align="left"| || align="center"|F || align="left"|Brazil || align="center"|1 || align="center"| || 10 || 100 || 21 || 3 || 26 || 10.0 || 2.1 || 0.3 || 2.6 || align=center|
|-
|align="left"| || align="center"|G/F || align="left"|CC San Francisco || align="center"|3 || align="center"|– || 184 ||  || 199 || 339 || 1,438 ||  || 3.0 || 1.8 || 7.8 || align=center|
|-
|align="left"| || align="center"|F || align="left"|Kansas || align="center"|1 || align="center"| || 64 || 678 || 78 || 61 || 205 || 10.6 || 1.2 || 1.0 || 3.2 || align=center|
|-
|align="left"| || align="center"|F/C || align="left"|Wichita State || align="center"|2 || align="center"|– || 110 || 3,451 || 593 || 257 || 2,165 || 31.4 || 5.4 || 2.3 || 19.7 || align=center|
|-
|align="left"| || align="center"|G/F || align="left"|North Carolina || align="center"|1 || align="center"| || 58 || 1,026 || 148 || 69 || 313 || 17.7 || 2.6 || 1.2 || 5.4 || align=center|
|-
|align="left"| || align="center"|F || align="left"|Israel || align="center"|5 || align="center"|–– || 306 || 7,326 || 1,416 || 392 || 2,937 || 23.9 || 4.6 || 1.3 || 9.6 || align=center|
|-
|align="left"| || align="center"|F || align="left"|Notre Dame || align="center"|1 || align="center"| || 9 || 40 || 4 || 1 || 6 || 4.4 || 0.4 || 0.1 || 0.7 || align=center|
|-
|align="left"| || align="center"|F/C || align="left"|Kentucky || align="center"|4 || align="center"|– || 295 || 7,090 || 1,879 || 483 || 2,971 || 24.0 || 6.4 || 1.6 || 10.1 || align=center|
|-
|align="left"| || align="center"|C || align="left"|Temple || align="center"|7 || align="center"|– || 429 || 8,340 || 2,009 || 229 || 2,373 || 19.4 || 4.7 || 0.5 || 5.5 || align=center|
|-
|align="left"| || align="center"|F/C || align="left"|Wake Forest || align="center"|2 || align="center"|– || 64 || 594 || 166 || 26 || 261 || 9.3 || 2.6 || 0.4 || 4.1 || align=center|
|-
|align="left"| || align="center"|F/C || align="left"|North Carolina || align="center"|3 || align="center"|– || 174 || 2,625 || 652 || 173 || 948 || 15.1 || 3.7 || 1.0 || 5.4 || align=center|
|-
|align="left"| || align="center"|F/C || align="left"|Toledo || align="center"|3 || align="center"|– || 200 || 3,635 || 982 || 265 || 976 || 18.2 || 4.9 || 1.3 || 4.9 || align=center|
|-
|align="left"| || align="center"|G/F || align="left"|Pepperdine || align="center"|5 || align="center"|– || 355 || 12,223 || 1,523 || 1,505 || 3,773 || 34.4 || 4.3 || 4.2 || 10.6 || align=center|
|-
|align="left"| || align="center"|F/C || align="left"|UNLV || align="center"|1 || align="center"| || 80 || 1,780 || 451 || 80 || 536 || 22.3 || 5.6 || 1.0 || 6.7 || align=center|
|-
|align="left"| || align="center"|G || align="left"|Michigan State || align="center"|2 || align="center"|– || 44 || 208 || 16 || 35 || 86 || 4.7 || 0.4 || 0.8 || 2.0 || align=center|
|-
|align="left" bgcolor="#FFCC00"|+ || align="center"|F/C || align="left"|Louisville || align="center"|7 || align="center"|– || 448 || 11,459 || 3,712 || 1,326 || 4,942 || 36.6 || 9.8 || 3.0 || 11.0 || align=center|
|-
|align="left"| || align="center"|G || align="left"|UCLA || align="center"|3 || align="center"|– || 187 || 5,847 || 464 || 882 || 2,660 || 31.3 || 2.5 || 4.7 || 14.2 || align=center|
|-
|align="left"| || align="center"|G || align="left"|New Mexico State || align="center"|1 || align="center"| || 19 || 251 || 26 || 37 || 58 || 13.2 || 1.4 || 1.9 || 3.1 || align=center|
|-
|align="left"| || align="center"|F/C || align="left"|Providence || align="center"|1 || align="center"| || 46 || 467 || 123 || 37 || 219 || 10.2 || 2.7 || 0.8 || 4.8 || align=center|
|-
|align="left"| || align="center"|F || align="left"|Saint Mary's || align="center"|1 || align="center"| || 6 || 38 || 10 || 1 || 9 || 6.3 || 1.7 || 0.2 || 1.5 || align=center|
|-
|align="left"| || align="center"|F/C || align="left"|Notre Dame || align="center"|1 || align="center"| || 7 || 87 || 30 || 6 || 40 || 12.4 || 4.3 || 0.9 || 5.7 || align=center|
|-
|align="left"| || align="center"|G/F || align="left"|DePaul || align="center"|2 || align="center"| || 103 || 1,871 || 344 || 121 || 531 || 18.2 || 3.3 || 1.2 || 5.2 || align=center|
|-
|align="left" bgcolor="#FFCC00"|+ || align="center"|F/C || align="left"|Kentucky || align="center"|7 || align="center"|– || 470 || 14,996 || 5,056 || 1,402 || 9,894 || 31.9 || 10.8 || 3.0 || 21.1 || align=center|
|-
|align="left" bgcolor="#FFFF99"|^ || align="center"|G || align="left"|Holy Cross || align="center"|1 || align="center"| || 7 || 34 || 5 || 10 || 5 || 4.9 || 0.7 || 1.4 || 0.7 || align=center|
|-
|align="left"| || align="center"|G || align="left"|Tennessee || align="center"|1 || align="center"| || 4 || 28 || 1 || 7 || 6 || 7.0 || 0.3 || 1.8 || 1.5 || align=center|
|-
|align="left"| || align="center"|F/C || align="left"|San Francisco || align="center"|1 || align="center"| || 3 || 24 || 4 || 0 || 0 || 8.0 || 1.3 || 0.0 || 0.0 || align=center|
|-
|align="left"| || align="center"|G || align="left"|Oregon State || align="center"|1 || align="center"| || 8 || 58 || 5 || 5 || 24 || 7.3 || 0.6 || 0.6 || 3.0 || align=center|
|-
|align="left"| || align="center"|G || align="left"|Notre Dame || align="center"|2 || align="center"|– || 123 ||  ||  || 149 || 602 ||  ||  || 1.2 || 4.9 || align=center|
|-
|align="left"| || align="center"|G || align="left"|Duke || align="center"|1 || align="center"| || 44 || 692 || 60 || 67 || 299 || 15.7 || 1.4 || 1.5 || 6.8 || align=center|
|}

D

|-
|align="left"| || align="center"|C || align="left"|Seton Hall || align="center"|1 || align="center"| || 80 || 1,938 || 657 || 67 || 644 || 24.2 || 8.2 || 0.8 || 8.1 || align=center|
|-
|align="left"| || align="center"|F || align="left"|Kentucky || align="center"|1 || align="center"| || 21 || 72 || 18 || 4 || 13 || 3.4 || 0.9 || 0.2 || 0.6 || align=center|
|-
|align="left"| || align="center"|G || align="left"|Mt. SAC || align="center"|1 || align="center"| || 5 || 28 || 4 || 1 || 6 || 5.6 || 0.8 || 0.2 || 1.2 || align=center|
|-
|align="left"| || align="center"|G || align="left"|Marshall || align="center"|3 || align="center"|– || 128 || 1,849 || 184 || 246 || 429 || 14.4 || 1.4 || 1.9 || 3.4 || align=center|
|-
|align="left" bgcolor="#FFFF99"|^ (#11) || align="center"|G/F || align="left"|Seton Hall || align="center"|7 || align="center"|– || 462 || 8,617 || 980 || 2,250 || 6,594 || 31.3 || 2.9 || 4.9 || 14.3 || align=center|
|-
|align="left"| || align="center"|G || align="left"|Cincinnati || align="center"|1 || align="center"| || 73 || 1,210 || 86 || 177 || 396 || 16.6 || 1.2 || 2.4 || 5.4 || align=center|
|-
|align="left"| || align="center"|C || align="left"|St. John's || align="center"|1 || align="center"| || 3 || 16 || 4 || 1 || 2 || 5.3 || 1.3 || 0.3 || 0.7 || align=center|
|-
|align="left"| || align="center"|F || align="left"|Florida State || align="center"|1 || align="center"| || 4 || 17 || 2 || 0 || 9 || 4.3 || 0.5 || 0.0 || 2.3 || align=center|
|-
|align="left"| || align="center"|F/C || align="left"|Indiana || align="center"|1 || align="center"| || 68 || 1,252 || 339 || 56 || 559 || 18.4 || 5.0 || 0.8 || 8.2 || align=center|
|-
|align="left"| || align="center"|G || align="left"|Seton Hall || align="center"|2 || align="center"|– || 81 || 1,430 || 108 || 197 || 498 || 17.7 || 1.3 || 2.4 || 6.1 || align=center|
|-
|align="left"| || align="center"|G || align="left"|NC State || align="center"|2 || align="center"|– || 156 || 3,414 || 369 || 456 || 1,308 || 21.9 || 2.4 || 2.9 || 8.4 || align=center|
|-
|align="left"| || align="center"|G || align="left"|Kentucky || align="center"|1 || align="center"| || 46 || 682 || 88 || 55 || 296 || 14.8 || 1.9 || 1.2 || 6.4 || align=center|
|-
|align="left"| || align="center"|F || align="left"|Duke || align="center"|2 || align="center"|– || 52 || 831 || 185 || 48 || 178 || 16.0 || 3.6 || 0.9 || 3.4 || align=center|
|-
|align="left"| || align="center"|F/C || align="left"|Cincinnati || align="center"|6 || align="center"|– || 374 || 10,335 || 2,984 || 784 || 4,972 || 27.6 || 8.0 || 2.1 || 13.3 || align=center|
|-
|align="left"| || align="center"|F || align="left"|New Mexico Highlands || align="center"|2 || align="center"|– || 136 || 1,899 || 479 || 86 || 637 || 14.0 || 3.5 || 0.6 || 4.7 || align=center|
|-
|align="left"| || align="center"|F || align="left"|Arizona State || align="center"|1 || align="center"| || 10 || 142 || 39 || 3 || 92 || 14.2 || 3.9 || 0.3 || 9.2 || align=center|
|-
|align="left" bgcolor="#FFFF99"|^ (#21) || align="center"|C || align="left"|Yugoslavia || align="center"|6 || align="center"|– || 454 || 13,676 || 3,538 || 1,693 || 5,176 || 30.1 || 7.8 || 3.7 || 11.4 || align=center|
|-
|align="left"| || align="center"|F || align="left"|Memphis || align="center"|1 || align="center"| || 8 || 52 || 18 || 0 || 12 || 6.5 || 2.3 || 0.0 || 1.5 || align=center|
|-
|align="left"| || align="center"|G || align="left"|Rutgers || align="center"|3 || align="center"|– || 136 || 1,462 || 145 || 81 || 557 || 10.8 || 1.1 || 0.6 || 4.1 || align=center|
|-
|align="left"| || align="center"|G || align="left"|Illinois || align="center"|1 || align="center"| || 8 || 98 || 14 || 17 || 14 || 12.3 || 1.8 || 2.1 || 1.8 || align=center|
|-
|align="left"| || align="center"|F/C || align="left"|Alabama || align="center"|3 || align="center"|– || 147 || 2,495 || 681 || 104 || 648 || 17.0 || 4.6 || 0.7 || 4.4 || align=center|
|-
|align="left"| || align="center"|G || align="left"|Florida State || align="center"|1 || align="center"| || 22 || 376 || 48 || 58 || 135 || 17.1 || 2.2 || 2.6 || 6.1 || align=center|
|-
|align="left"| || align="center"|G || align="left"|Missouri || align="center"|5 || align="center"|– || 376 || 11,370 || 791 || 2,409 || 5,543 || 30.2 || 2.1 || 6.4 || 14.7 || align=center|
|-
|align="left"| || align="center"|G || align="left"|St. John's || align="center"|1 || align="center"| || 34 || 424 || 56 || 47 || 132 || 12.5 || 1.6 || 1.4 || 3.9 || align=center|
|-
|align="left"| || align="center"|F || align="left"|Wisconsin || align="center"|1 || align="center"| || 1 || 24 || 4 || 1 || 6 || 24.0 || 4.0 || 1.0 || 6.0 || align=center|
|-
|align="left"| || align="center"|F/C || align="left"|William & Mary || align="center"|2 || align="center"|– || 122 ||  ||  || 93 || 717 ||  ||  || 0.8 || 5.9 || align=center|
|-
|align="left"| || align="center"|F || align="left"|La Salle || align="center"|4 || align="center"|– || 93 || 935 || 171 || 44 || 394 || 10.1 || 1.8 || 0.5 || 4.2 || align=center|
|}

E

|-
|align="left"| || align="center"|C || align="left"|BYU || align="center"|1 || align="center"| || 82 || 1,338 || 361 || 119 || 490 || 16.3 || 4.4 || 1.5 || 6.0 || align=center|
|-
|align="left"| || align="center"|G || align="left"|Louisville || align="center"|1 || align="center"| || 3 || 26 || 1 || 0 || 4 || 8.7 || 0.3 || 0.0 || 1.3 || align=center|
|-
|align="left"| || align="center"|G || align="left"|UCLA || align="center"|2 || align="center"|– || 150 || 3,857 || 314 || 717 || 1,345 || 25.7 || 2.1 || 4.8 || 9.0 || align=center|
|-
|align="left"| || align="center"|G || align="left"|Cleveland State || align="center"|2 || align="center"|– || 24 || 536 || 29 || 121 || 160 || 22.3 || 1.2 || 5.0 || 6.7 || align=center|
|-
|align="left"| || align="center"|F/C || align="left"|Louisville || align="center"|1 || align="center"| || 34 || 866 || 196 || 65 || 271 || 25.5 || 5.8 || 1.9 || 8.0 || align=center|
|-
|align="left"| || align="center"|F/C || align="left"|Maryland || align="center"|1 || align="center"| || 58 || 915 || 257 || 64 || 259 || 15.8 || 4.4 || 1.1 || 4.5 || align=center|
|-
|align="left" bgcolor="#FFFF99"|^ || align="center"|F/C || align="left"|Miami (OH) || align="center"|8 || align="center"|– || 603 || 17,591 || 6,257 || 951 || 8,486 || 29.2 || 10.4 || 1.6 || 14.1 || align=center|
|-
|align="left"| || align="center"|G || align="left"|Texas || align="center"|1 || align="center"| || 65 || 1,233 || 201 || 45 || 416 || 19.0 || 3.1 || 0.7 || 6.4 || align=center|
|-
|align="left"| || align="center"|F || align="left"|Iowa || align="center"|2 || align="center"|– || 71 || 1,264 || 484 || 48 || 309 || 17.8 || 6.8 || 0.7 || 4.4 || align=center|
|-
|align="left"| || align="center"|G/F || align="left"|Memphis || align="center"|5 || align="center"|– || 271 || 9,276 || 1,282 || 1,278 || 4,649 || 34.2 || 4.7 || 4.7 || 17.2 || align=center|
|-
|align="left"| || align="center"|G || align="left"|UCLA || align="center"|1 || align="center"| || 2 || 35 || 3 || 9 || 12 || 17.5 || 1.5 || 4.5 || 6.0 || align=center|
|-
|align="left"| || align="center"|F || align="left"|San Francisco || align="center"|1 || align="center"| || 57 || 1,295 || 378 || 81 || 429 || 22.7 || 6.6 || 1.4 || 7.5 || align=center|
|-
|align="left" bgcolor="#CCFFCC"|x || align="center"|G || align="left"|Indiana || align="center"|1 || align="center"| || 71 || 1,067 || 109 || 137 || 420 || 15.0 || 1.5 || 1.9 || 5.9 || align=center|
|-
|align="left"| || align="center"|F/C || align="left"|Seton Hall || align="center"|1 || align="center"| || 18 ||  ||  || 12 || 19 ||  ||  || 0.7 || 1.1 || align=center|
|-
|align="left"| || align="center"|G/F || align="left"|Niagara || align="center"|2 || align="center"|– || 122 || 2,955 || 672 || 278 || 1,246 || 24.2 || 5.5 || 2.3 || 10.2 || align=center|
|-
|align="left"| || align="center"|G || align="left"|North Carolina || align="center"|4 || align="center"|– || 299 || 9,583 || 587 || 2,322 || 4,454 || 32.1 || 2.0 || 7.8 || 14.9 || align=center|
|-
|align="left"| || align="center"|F || align="left"|Miami (OH) || align="center"|3 || align="center"|– || 131 || 2,595 || 375 || 143 || 1,296 || 19.8 || 2.9 || 1.1 || 9.9 || align=center|
|-
|align="left" bgcolor="#CCFFCC"|x || align="center"|G || align="left"|Kentucky || align="center"|2 || align="center"|– || 154 || 4,572 || 508 || 910 || 2,243 || 29.7 || 3.3 || 5.9 || 14.6 || align=center|
|-
|align="left"| || align="center"|F/C || align="left"|South Carolina || align="center"|2 || align="center"| || 102 || 2,291 || 754 || 92 || 975 || 22.5 || 7.4 || 0.9 || 9.6 || align=center|
|-
|align="left"| || align="center"|F || align="left"|Pepperdine || align="center"|1 || align="center"| || 35 || 475 || 84 || 44 || 177 || 13.6 || 2.4 || 1.3 || 5.1 || align=center|
|-
|align="left"| || align="center"|G || align="left"|BYU || align="center"|3 || align="center"|– || 171 || 2,565 || 189 || 261 || 1,197 || 15.0 || 1.1 || 1.5 || 7.0 || align=center|
|-
|align="left"| || align="center"|G || align="left"|Colorado || align="center"|1 || align="center"| || 48 || 363 || 41 || 55 || 123 || 7.6 || 0.9 || 1.1 || 2.6 || align=center|
|-
|align="left"| || align="center"|F || align="left"|Ohio State || align="center"|6 || align="center"|– || 316 || 4,705 || 1,139 || 183 || 2,022 || 14.9 || 3.6 || 0.6 || 6.4 || align=center|
|}

G

|-
|align="left"| || align="center"|G || align="left"|Saint Joseph's || align="center"|1 || align="center"| || 19 || 375 || 35 || 28 || 114 || 19.7 || 1.8 || 1.5 || 6.0 || align=center|
|-
|align="left"| || align="center"|F || align="left"|Oregon State || align="center"|1 || align="center"| || 19 ||  ||  ||  ||  ||  ||  ||  ||  || align=center|
|-
|align="left"| || align="center"|G/F || align="left"|Iowa || align="center"|2 || align="center"|– || 83 || 1,245 || 134 || 95 || 388 || 15.0 || 1.6 || 1.1 || 4.7 || align=center|
|-
|align="left"| || align="center"|G/F || align="left"|Louisville || align="center"|8 || align="center"|– || 462 || 10,251 || 1,238 || 649 || 3,848 || 22.2 || 2.7 || 1.4 || 8.3 || align=center|
|-
|align="left"| || align="center"|F || align="left"|UConn || align="center"|4 || align="center"|– || 223 || 7,692 || 1,349 || 622 || 4,305 || 34.5 || 6.0 || 2.8 || 19.3 || align=center|
|-
|align="left"| || align="center"|G/F || align="left"|Virginia || align="center"|3 || align="center"|– || 145 || 1,451 || 303 || 70 || 657 || 10.0 || 2.1 || 0.5 || 4.5 || align=center|
|-
|align="left"| || align="center"|G/F || align="left"|UTEP || align="center"|1 || align="center"| || 66 || 733 || 94 || 61 || 207 || 11.1 || 1.4 || 0.9 || 3.1 || align=center|
|-
|align="left" bgcolor="#CCFFCC"|x || align="center"|F/C || align="left"|Duke || align="center"|1 || align="center"| || 58 || 820 || 222 || 85 || 408 || 14.1 || 3.8 || 1.5 || 7.0 || align=center|
|-
|align="left"| || align="center"|C || align="left"|Georgetown || align="center"|1 || align="center"| || 24 || 84 || 23 || 2 || 25 || 3.5 || 1.0 || 0.1 || 1.0 || align=center|
|-
|align="left"| || align="center"|G/F || align="left"|Purdue || align="center"|1 || align="center"| || 57 || 1,161 || 215 || 178 || 426 || 20.4 || 3.8 || 3.1 || 7.5 || align=center|
|-
|align="left"| || align="center"|F || align="left"|Kansas || align="center"|1 || align="center"| || 1 || 26 || 13 || 2 || 12 || 26.0 || 13.0 || 2.0 || 12.0 || align=center|
|-
|align="left"| || align="center"|F || align="left"|Xavier || align="center"|3 || align="center"|– || 182 || 5,294 || 1,285 || 254 || 2,430 || 29.1 || 7.1 || 1.4 || 13.4 || align=center|
|-
|align="left"| || align="center"|C || align="left"|Pittsburgh || align="center"|1 || align="center"| || 33 || 335 || 103 || 19 || 60 || 10.2 || 3.1 || 0.6 || 1.8 || align=center|
|-
|align="left"| || align="center"|F || align="left"|Clemson || align="center"|1 || align="center"| || 3 || 25 || 9 || 2 || 8 || 8.3 || 3.0 || 0.7 || 2.7 || align=center|
|-
|align="left"| || align="center"|G || align="left"|Oklahoma City || align="center"|1 || align="center"| || 44 || 276 || 23 || 26 || 105 || 6.3 || 0.5 || 0.6 || 2.4 || align=center|
|-
|align="left"| || align="center"|G/F || align="left"|Iowa State || align="center"|1 || align="center"| || 25 || 316 || 38 || 25 || 91 || 12.6 || 1.5 || 1.0 || 3.6 || align=center|
|-
|align="left" bgcolor="#FFCC00"|+ || align="center"|F/C || align="left"|Michigan State || align="center"|4 || align="center"|– || 301 || 7,584 || 2,418 || 380 || 3,740 || 25.2 || 8.0 || 1.3 || 12.4 || align=center|
|-
|align="left"| || align="center"|F/C || align="left"|Louisiana Tech || align="center"|1 || align="center"| || 21 || 459 || 113 || 28 || 162 || 21.9 || 5.4 || 1.3 || 7.7 || align=center|
|-
|align="left"| || align="center"|G/F || align="left"|Duquesne || align="center"|2 || align="center"|  || 33 || 1,089 || 207 || 132 || 399 || 33.0 || 6.3 || 4.0 || 12.1 || align=center|
|-
|align="left"| || align="center"|F || align="left"|Syracuse || align="center"|4 || align="center"|– || 253 || 4,259 || 600 || 183 || 1,541 || 16.8 || 2.4 || 0.7 || 6.1 || align=center|
|-
|align="left"| || align="center"|G || align="left"|Louisiana || align="center"|1 || align="center"| || 7 || 61 || 6 || 3 || 6 || 8.7 || 0.9 || 0.4 || 0.9 || align=center|
|-
|align="left"| || align="center"|F || align="left"|Missouri || align="center"|1 || align="center"| || 9 || 34 || 4 || 0 || 14 || 3.8 || 0.4 || 0.0 || 1.6 || align=center|
|-
|align="left"| || align="center"|G/F || align="left"|Tennessee || align="center"|3 || align="center"|– || 240 || 4,873 || 620 || 590 || 2,099 || 20.3 || 2.6 || 2.5 || 8.7 || align=center|
|-
|align="left"| || align="center"|G/F || align="left"|Saint Joseph's || align="center"|4 || align="center"|– || 187 || 5,651 || 455 || 802 || 1,337 || 30.2 || 2.4 || 4.3 || 7.1 || align=center|
|}

H

|-
|align="left"| || align="center"|F || align="left"|NYU || align="center"|4 || align="center"|– || 260 || 6,597 || 1,825 || 191 || 3,399 || 25.4 || 7.0 || 0.7 || 13.1 || align=center|
|-
|align="left" bgcolor="#FFFF99"|^ || align="center"|F/C || align="left"|USC || align="center"|3 || align="center"|– || 171 || 2,995 || 772 || 245 || 968 || 21.4 || 4.5 || 1.4 || 5.7 || align=center|
|-
|align="left"| || align="center"|G || align="left"|Iowa || align="center"|2 || align="center"|– || 38 || 851 || 100 || 91 || 237 || 22.4 || 2.6 || 2.4 || 6.2 || align=center|
|-
|align="left"| || align="center"|G || align="left"|LSU || align="center"|3 || align="center"|– || 110 || 1,443 || 247 || 93 || 588 || 13.1 || 2.2 || 0.8 || 5.3 || align=center|
|-
|align="left"| || align="center"|G || align="left"|Dayton || align="center"|1 || align="center"| || 26 || 252 || 26 || 26 || 60 || 9.7 || 1.0 || 1.0 || 2.3 || align=center|
|-
|align="left"| || align="center"|G || align="left"|Syracuse || align="center"|2 || align="center"|– || 79 || 918 || 86 || 80 || 261 || 11.6 || 1.1 || 1.0 || 3.3 || align=center|
|-
|align="left"| || align="center"|G || align="left"|Kentucky || align="center"|1 || align="center"| || 22 || 657 || 81 || 30 || 166 || 29.9 || 3.7 || 1.4 || 7.5 || align=center|
|-
|align="left"| || align="center"|F/C || align="left"|Washington || align="center"|3 || align="center"|– || 220 || 5,094 || 1,215 || 351 || 1,933 || 23.2 || 5.5 || 1.6 || 8.8 || align=center|
|-
|align="left"| || align="center"|G || align="left"|Xavier || align="center"|1 || align="center"| || 24 || 203 || 25 || 27 || 36 || 8.5 || 1.0 || 1.1 || 1.5 || align=center|
|-
|align="left"| || align="center"|F || align="left"|Notre Dame || align="center"|4 || align="center"|– || 310 || 7,481 || 2,028 || 353 || 2,588 || 24.1 || 6.5 || 1.1 || 8.3 || align=center|
|-
|align="left"| || align="center"|F/C || align="left"|Kentucky || align="center"|3 || align="center"|– || 144 || 2,427 || 580 || 195 || 403 || 16.9 || 4.0 || 1.4 || 2.8 || align=center|
|-
|align="left"| || align="center"|F || align="left"|Wisconsin || align="center"|1 || align="center"| || 5 || 105 || 22 || 4 || 18 || 21.0 || 4.4 || 0.8 || 3.6 || align=center|
|-
|align="left"| || align="center"|G || align="left"|Illinois || align="center"|1 || align="center"| || 36 || 586 || 60 || 70 || 200 || 16.3 || 1.7 || 1.9 || 5.6 || align=center|
|-
|align="left"| || align="center"|F || align="left"|Washington State || align="center"|1 || align="center"| || 48 || 737 || 143 || 41 || 163 || 15.4 || 3.0 || 0.9 || 3.4 || align=center|
|-
|align="left"| || align="center"|F/C || align="left"|California || align="center"|1 || align="center"| || 56 || 1,235 || 435 || 79 || 308 || 22.1 || 7.8 || 1.4 || 5.5 || align=center|
|-
|align="left"| || align="center"|G || align="left"|Kansas || align="center"|1 || align="center"| || 28 || 149 || 19 || 4 || 78 || 5.3 || 0.7 || 0.1 || 2.8 || align=center|
|-
|align="left"| || align="center"|G || align="left"|UC Santa Barbara || align="center"|1 || align="center"| || 15 || 207 || 20 || 26 || 117 || 13.8 || 1.3 || 1.7 || 7.8 || align=center|
|-
|align="left"| || align="center"|F/C || align="left"|Davidson || align="center"|1 || align="center"| || 31 || 685 || 140 || 29 || 368 || 22.1 || 4.5 || 0.9 || 11.9 || align=center|
|-
|align="left"| || align="center"|G/F || align="left"|Duke || align="center"|1 || align="center"| || 11 || 100 || 13 || 7 || 40 || 9.1 || 1.2 || 0.6 || 3.6 || align=center|
|-
|align="left"| || align="center"|F/C || align="left"|NC State || align="center"|1 || align="center"| || 35 || 644 || 177 || 22 || 165 || 18.4 || 5.1 || 0.6 || 4.7 || align=center|
|-
|align="left" bgcolor="#CCFFCC"|x || align="center"|G || align="left"|Oklahoma || align="center"|3 || align="center"|– || 187 || 5,366 || 822 || 404 || 3,152 || 28.7 || 4.4 || 2.2 || 16.9 || align=center|
|-
|align="left"| || align="center"|F || align="left"|Northern Colorado || align="center"|1 || align="center"| || 7 || 61 || 5 || 2 || 16 || 8.7 || 0.7 || 0.3 || 2.3 || align=center|
|-
|align="left"| || align="center"|F || align="left"|Fresno State || align="center"|1 || align="center"| || 69 || 1,425 || 193 || 119 || 571 || 20.7 || 2.8 || 1.7 || 8.3 || align=center|
|-
|align="left"| || align="center"|G || align="left"|IUPUI || align="center"|1 || align="center"| || 43 || 1,143 || 117 || 119 || 441 || 26.6 || 2.7 || 2.8 || 10.3 || align=center|
|-
|align="left"| || align="center"|F/C || align="left"|San Jose State || align="center"|1 || align="center"| || 78 || 1,618 || 431 || 91 || 547 || 20.7 || 5.5 || 1.2 || 7.0 || align=center|
|-
|align="left"| || align="center"|F/C || align="left"|Kansas State || align="center"|1 || align="center"| || 30 || 556 || 119 || 15 || 145 || 18.5 || 4.0 || 0.5 || 4.8 || align=center|
|-
|align="left"| || align="center"|C || align="left"|UCLA || align="center"|1 || align="center"| || 46 || 441 || 103 || 14 || 137 || 9.6 || 2.2 || 0.3 || 3.0 || align=center|
|-
|align="left" bgcolor="#FFFF99"|^ || align="center"|G || align="left"|CCNY || align="center"|5 || align="center"|– || 307 || 1,457 || 298 || 646 || 1,970 || 13.1 || 1.7 || 2.1 || 6.4 || align=center|
|-
|align="left"| || align="center"|F || align="left"|UCLA || align="center"|2 || align="center"|– || 24 || 120 || 24 || 9 || 28 || 5.0 || 1.0 || 0.4 || 1.2 || align=center|
|-
|align="left"| || align="center"|G/F || align="left"|Ohio State || align="center"|1 || align="center"| || 69 || 1,304 || 206 || 102 || 741 || 18.9 || 3.0 || 1.5 || 10.7 || align=center|
|-
|align="left"| || align="center"|G || align="left"|Arizona State || align="center"|1 || align="center"| || 50 || 550 || 61 || 67 || 237 || 11.0 || 1.2 || 1.3 || 4.7 || align=center|
|-
|align="left"| || align="center"|F || align="left"|Oklahoma State || align="center"|1 || align="center"| || 25 || 276 || 84 || 7 || 86 || 11.0 || 3.4 || 0.3 || 3.4 || align=center|
|-
|align="left"| || align="center"|G || align="left"|Duke || align="center"|5 || align="center"|– || 242 || 3,712 || 253 || 783 || 910 || 15.3 || 1.0 || 3.2 || 3.8 || align=center|
|-
|align="left"| || align="center"|F || align="left"|Eastern New Mexico || align="center"|1 || align="center"| || 77 || 1,359 || 332 || 48 || 417 || 17.6 || 4.3 || 0.6 || 5.4 || align=center|
|}

I to J

|-
|align="left"| || align="center"|C || align="left"|California || align="center"|2 || align="center"|– || 43 || 902 || 260 || 81 || 298 || 21.0 || 6.0 || 1.9 || 6.9 || align=center|
|-
|align="left"| || align="center"|G || align="left"|Wilberforce || align="center"|1 || align="center"| || 2 || 17 || 0 || 1 || 0 || 8.5 || 0.0 || 0.5 || 0.0 || align=center|
|-
|align="left"| || align="center"|G || align="left"|Minnesota || align="center"|6 || align="center"|– || 365 || 8,279 || 1,175 || 814 || 3,879 || 22.7 || 3.2 || 2.2 || 10.6 || align=center|
|-
|align="left"| || align="center"|F || align="left"|Kansas || align="center"|1 || align="center"| || 59 || 486 || 94 || 14 || 187 || 8.2 || 1.6 || 0.2 || 3.2 || align=center|
|-
|align="left"| || align="center"|G || align="left"|Ohio State || align="center"|1 || align="center"| || 63 || 1,309 || 262 || 118 || 487 || 20.8 || 4.2 || 1.9 || 7.7 || align=center|
|-
|align="left"| || align="center"|G/F || align="left"|North Carolina || align="center"|2 || align="center"|– || 120 || 2,589 || 333 || 142 || 799 || 21.6 || 2.8 || 1.2 || 6.7 || align=center|
|-
|align="left"| || align="center"|G || align="left"|Georgetown || align="center"|3 || align="center"|– || 89 || 888 || 70 || 198 || 188 || 10.0 || 0.8 || 2.2 || 2.1 || align=center|
|-
|align="left"| || align="center"|F || align="left"|St. Mary's (TX) || align="center"|1 || align="center"| || 8 || 79 || 10 || 1 || 60 || 9.9 || 1.3 || 0.1 || 7.5 || align=center|
|-
|align="left"| || align="center"|C || align="left"|Florida A&M || align="center"|1 || align="center"| || 16 || 42 || 17 || 1 || 24 || 2.6 || 1.1 || 0.1 || 1.5 || align=center|
|-
|align="left"| || align="center"|C || align="left"|Iowa || align="center"|1 || align="center"| || 31 || 87 || 30 || 1 || 25 || 2.8 || 1.0 || 0.0 || 0.8 || align=center|
|-
|align="left"| || align="center"|G || align="left"|Portland || align="center"|1 || align="center"| || 62 || 858 || 70 || 162 || 255 || 13.8 || 1.1 || 2.6 || 4.1 || align=center|
|-
|align="left"| || align="center"|G || align="left"|College of Charleston || align="center"|2 || align="center"| || 104 || 2,676 || 210 || 389 || 678 || 25.7 || 2.0 || 3.7 || 6.5 || align=center|
|-
|align="left"| || align="center"|F/C || align="left"|Bemidji State || align="center"|5 || align="center"|– || 332 || 4,142 || 1,272 || 731 || 2,888 || 30.5 || 6.2 || 2.2 || 8.7 || align=center|
|-
|align="left"| || align="center"|G || align="left"|La Salle || align="center"|1 || align="center"| || 1 || 6 || 0 || 0 || 2 || 6.0 || 0.0 || 0.0 || 2.0 || align=center|
|-
|align="left"| || align="center"|G/F || align="left"|Illinois || align="center"|6 || align="center"|– || 483 || 15,370 || 2,457 || 1,359 || 9,027 || 31.8 || 5.1 || 2.8 || 18.7 || align=center|
|-
|align="left"| || align="center"|F || align="left"|Wake Forest || align="center"|1 || align="center"| || 54 || 878 || 145 || 58 || 276 || 16.3 || 2.7 || 1.1 || 5.1 || align=center|
|-
|align="left"| || align="center"|F || align="left"|Temple || align="center"|3 || align="center"|– || 192 || 4,044 || 635 || 281 || 1,519 || 21.1 || 3.3 || 1.5 || 7.9 || align=center|
|-
|align="left"| || align="center"|G || align="left"|UC Santa Barbara || align="center"|1 || align="center"| || 7 || 50 || 4 || 4 || 9 || 7.1 || 0.6 || 0.6 || 1.3 || align=center|
|-
|align="left"| || align="center"|F/C || align="left"|Tennessee || align="center"|2 || align="center"|– || 81 || 1,775 || 390 || 79 || 807 || 21.9 || 4.8 || 1.0 || 10.0 || align=center|
|-
|align="left"| || align="center"|F/C || align="left"|Oregon State || align="center"|3 || align="center"|– || 207 || 4,178 || 1,109 || 249 || 2,409 || 20.2 || 5.4 || 1.2 || 11.6 || align=center|
|-
|align="left"| || align="center"|G/F || align="left"|Duke || align="center"|1 || align="center"| || 25 || 206 || 35 || 12 || 81 || 8.2 || 1.4 || 0.5 || 3.2 || align=center|
|-
|align="left"| || align="center"|G || align="left"|Houston || align="center"|1 || align="center"| || 49 || 709 || 70 || 80 || 224 || 14.5 || 1.4 || 1.6 || 4.6 || align=center|
|-
|align="left"| || align="center"|G || align="left"|Assumption || align="center"|1 || align="center"| || 11 || 161 || 20 || 10 || 57 || 14.6 || 1.8 || 0.9 || 5.2 || align=center|
|-
|align="left"| || align="center"|F/C || align="left"|Whitworth || align="center"|2 || align="center"|– || 123 || 3,206 || 1,048 || 314 || 1,525 || 26.1 || 8.5 || 2.6 || 12.4 || align=center|
|}

K to L

|-
|align="left"| || align="center"|F/C || align="left"|Stanford || align="center"|1 || align="center"| || 37 || 324 || 81 || 43 || 74 || 8.8 || 2.2 || 1.2 || 2.0 || align=center|
|-
|align="left"| || align="center"|F/C || align="left"|UConn || align="center"|1 || align="center"| || 67 || 643 || 191 || 27 || 236 || 9.6 || 2.9 || 0.4 || 3.5 || align=center|
|-
|align="left"| || align="center"|G || align="left"|Xavier || align="center"|1 || align="center"| || 3 || 15 || 0 || 1 || 5 || 5.0 || 0.0 || 0.3 || 1.7 || align=center|
|-
|align="left"| || align="center"|G || align="left"|Charleston || align="center"|1 || align="center"| || 63 || 2,272 || 306 || 337 || 610 || 36.1 || 4.9 || 5.3 || 9.7 || align=center|
|-
|align="left"| || align="center"|G || align="left"|Tulsa || align="center"|1 || align="center"| || 31 || 286 || 46 || 42 || 90 || 9.2 || 1.5 || 1.4 || 2.9 || align=center|
|-
|align="left"| || align="center"|F || align="left"|Alabama || align="center"|4 || align="center"|– || 301 || 8,399 || 2,115 || 459 || 3,129 || 27.9 || 7.0 || 1.5 || 10.4 || align=center|
|-
|align="left"| || align="center"|C || align="left"|BYU || align="center"|1 || align="center"| || 71 || 1,515 || 377 || 76 || 230 || 21.3 || 5.3 || 1.1 || 3.2 || align=center|
|-
|align="left"| || align="center"|C || align="left"|Arkansas || align="center"|4 || align="center"|– || 288 || 5,750 || 1,676 || 245 || 2,150 || 20.0 || 5.8 || 0.9 || 7.5 || align=center|
|-
|align="left"| || align="center"|G/F || align="left"|Pittsburgh || align="center"|2 || align="center"|– || 91 || 2,074 || 277 || 181 || 1,039 || 22.8 || 3.0 || 2.0 || 11.4 || align=center|
|-
|align="left"| || align="center"|F || align="left"|Marquette || align="center"|3 || align="center"|– || 175 || 3,563 || 620 || 200 || 1,780 || 20.4 || 3.5 || 1.1 || 10.2 || align=center|
|-
|align="left"| || align="center"|G || align="left"|Bowling Green || align="center"|1 || align="center"| || 44 || 830 || 43 || 97 || 189 || 18.9 || 1.0 || 2.2 || 4.3 || align=center|
|-
|align="left"| || align="center"|C || align="left"|Tennessee || align="center"|2 || align="center"|– || 76 || 506 || 144 || 53 || 110 || 6.7 || 1.9 || 0.7 || 1.4 || align=center|
|-
|align="left"| || align="center"|C || align="left"|Ohio State || align="center"|4 || align="center"|– || 262 || 4,794 || 1,475 || 203 || 1,632 || 18.3 || 5.6 || 0.8 || 6.2 || align=center|
|-
|align="left"| || align="center"|G || align="left"|North Carolina || align="center"|1 || align="center"| || 78 || 1,215 || 114 || 252 || 377 || 15.6 || 1.5 || 3.2 || 4.8 || align=center|
|-
|align="left"| || align="center"|F || align="left"|Kentucky || align="center"|3 || align="center"|– || 106 || 1,965 || 474 || 105 || 848 || 18.5 || 4.5 || 1.0 || 8.0 || align=center|
|-
|align="left" bgcolor="#FFCC00"|+ (#44)|| align="center"|C || align="left"|New Mexico State || align="center" bgcolor="#CFECEC"|12 || align="center"|– || bgcolor="#CFECEC"|888 || 29,991 || bgcolor="#CFECEC"|9,353 || 3,563 || 9,895 || 33.8 || 10.5 || 4.0 || 11.1 || align=center|
|-
|align="left"| || align="center"|F/C || align="left"|USC || align="center"|2 || align="center"|– || 85 || 968 || 217 || 48 || 290 || 11.4 || 2.6 || 0.6 || 3.4 || align=center|
|-
|align="left"| || align="center"|F || align="left"|Purdue || align="center"|4 || align="center"|–– || 169 || 3,885 || 760 || 107 || 1,714 || 23.0 || 4.5 || 0.6 || 10.1 || align=center|
|-
|align="left"| || align="center"|G || align="left"|North Carolina || align="center"|1 || align="center"| || 69 || 1,732 || 179 || 334 || 681 || 25.1 || 2.6 || 4.8 || 9.9 || align=center|
|-
|align="left"| || align="center"|F/C || align="left"|Wyoming || align="center"|1 || align="center"| || 32 || 378 || 87 || 18 || 94 || 11.8 || 2.7 || 0.6 || 2.9 || align=center|
|-
|align="left"| || align="center"|G/F || align="left"|Purdue || align="center"|1 || align="center"| || 22 || 75 || 5 || 5 || 43 || 3.4 || 0.2 || 0.2 || 2.0 || align=center|
|-
|align="left"| || align="center"|G || align="left"|Bradley || align="center"|4 || align="center"|– || 208 || 3,161 || 276 || 650 || 999 || 15.2 || 1.3 || 3.1 || 4.8 || align=center|
|-
|align="left"| || align="center"|G/F || align="left"|St. John's || align="center"|1 || align="center"| || 36 ||  ||  || 39 || 123 ||  ||  || 1.1 || 3.4 || align=center|
|-
|align="left"| || align="center"|G || align="left"|Arizona State || align="center"|1 || align="center"| || 32 || 334 || 44 || 40 || 149 || 10.4 || 1.4 || 1.3 || 4.7 || align=center|
|-
|align="left"| || align="center"|G/F || align="left"|Alabama State || align="center"|3 || align="center"|– || 147 || 2,090 || 338 || 174 || 875 || 14.2 || 2.3 || 1.2 || 6.0 || align=center|
|-
|align="left"| || align="center"|F/C || align="left"|Iowa || align="center"|1 || align="center"| || 29 || 476 || 114 || 17 || 233 || 16.4 || 3.9 || 0.6 || 8.0 || align=center|
|-
|align="left"| || align="center"|F || align="left"|Cincinnati || align="center"|1 || align="center"| || 9 || 20 || 8 || 1 || 0 || 2.2 || 0.9 || 0.1 || 0.0 || align=center|
|-
|align="left"| || align="center"|F || align="left"|Southern || align="center"|2 || align="center"|– || 138 || 2,142 || 466 || 104 || 903 || 15.5 || 3.4 || 0.8 || 6.5 || align=center|
|-
|align="left" bgcolor="#FFFF99"|^ || align="center"|F/C || align="left"|Kansas || align="center"|1 || align="center"| || 71 || 2,589 || 862 || 134 || 1,659 || 36.5 || 12.1 || 1.9 || 23.4 || align=center|
|-
|align="left" bgcolor="#FFFF99"|^ || align="center"|F/C || align="left"|Ohio State || align="center"|7 || align="center"|– || 465 || 20,024 || 8,876 || 1,408 || 9,107 || 43.1 || bgcolor="#CFECEC"|19.1 || 3.0 || 19.6 || align=center|
|}

M

|-
|align="left"| || align="center"|G || align="left"|CCNY || align="center"|1 || align="center"| || 9 ||  ||  || 6 || 30 ||  ||  || 0.7 || 3.3 || align=center|
|-
|align="left"| || align="center"|G || align="left"|Princeton || align="center"|1 || align="center"| || 5 || 45 || 3 || 2 || 12 || 9.0 || 0.6 || 0.4 || 2.4 || align=center|
|-
|align="left" bgcolor="#FFFF99"|^ || align="center"|G || align="left"|Soviet Union || align="center"|1 || align="center"| || 53 || 1,039 || 77 || 118 || 571 || 19.6 || 1.5 || 2.2 || 10.8 || align=center|
|-
|align="left"| || align="center"|G/F || align="left"|Western Kentucky || align="center"|4 || align="center"|– || 159 || 2,521 || 484 || 184 || 931 || 15.9 || 3.0 || 1.2 || 5.9 || align=center|
|-
|align="left"| || align="center"|G || align="left"|UCLA || align="center"|2 || align="center"|– || 102 || 1,069 || 60 || 136 || 505 || 10.5 || 0.6 || 1.3 || 5.0 || align=center|
|-
|align="left"| || align="center"|G || align="left"|Western Carolina || align="center"|6 || align="center"|– || 331 || 10,123 || 1,211 || 616 || 5,660 || 30.6 || 3.7 || 1.9 || 17.1 || align=center|
|-
|align="left"| || align="center"|G || align="left"|Canisius || align="center"|1 || align="center"| || 11 || 50 || 7 || 7 || 23 || 4.5 || 0.6 || 0.6 || 2.1 || align=center|
|-
|align="left"| || align="center"|F || align="left"|Oklahoma State || align="center"|1 || align="center"| || 5 || 66 || 13 || 2 || 13 || 13.2 || 2.6 || 0.4 || 2.6 || align=center|
|-
|align="left"| || align="center"|G || align="left"|Kansas || align="center"|2 || align="center"|– || 90 || 1,419 || 173 || 231 || 608 || 15.8 || 1.9 || 2.6 || 6.8 || align=center|
|-
|align="left"| || align="center"|F || align="left"|Maryland || align="center"|1 || align="center"| || 59 || 789 || 188 || 29 || 251 || 13.4 || 3.2 || 0.5 || 4.3 || align=center|
|-
|align="left"| || align="center"|G || align="left"|Florida || align="center"|1 || align="center"| || 46 || 1,007 || 85 || 76 || 492 || 21.9 || 1.8 || 1.7 || 10.7 || align=center|
|-
|align="left"| || align="center"|F || align="left"|Dayton || align="center"|1 || align="center"| || 29 || 139 || 13 || 5 || 64 || 4.8 || 0.4 || 0.2 || 2.2 || align=center|
|-
|align="left"| || align="center"|F || align="left"|North Carolina || align="center"|1 || align="center"| || 37 || 331 || 70 || 17 || 123 || 8.9 || 1.9 || 0.5 || 3.3 || align=center|
|-
|align="left"| || align="center"|G || align="left"|Texas || align="center"|1 || align="center"| || 64 || 2,145 || 178 || 253 || 915 || 33.5 || 2.8 || 4.0 || 14.3 || align=center|
|-
|align="left"| || align="center"|F || align="left"|UCLA || align="center"|1 || align="center"| || 9 || 196 || 27 || 15 || 40 || 21.8 || 3.0 || 1.7 || 4.4 || align=center|
|-
|align="left"| || align="center"|G || align="left"|Detroit Mercy || align="center"|2 || align="center"|– || 113 || 2,333 || 259 || 308 || 783 || 20.6 || 2.3 || 2.7 || 6.9 || align=center|
|-
|align="left"| || align="center"|G || align="left"|North Carolina || align="center"|1 || align="center"| || 24 || 465 || 47 || 36 || 246 || 19.4 || 2.0 || 1.5 || 10.3 || align=center|
|-
|align="left"| || align="center"|G || align="left"|UCLA || align="center"|2 || align="center"|– || 60 || 734 || 56 || 99 || 270 || 12.2 || 0.9 || 1.7 || 4.5 || align=center|
|-
|align="left"| || align="center"|G || align="left"|Canisius || align="center"|2 || align="center"| || 119 || 3,387 || 428 || 332 || 1,082 || 28.5 || 3.6 || 2.8 || 9.1 || align=center|
|-
|align="left"| || align="center"|G/F || align="left"|Louisville || align="center"|2 || align="center"|– || 150 || 5,673 || 1,183 || 670 || 2,212 || 37.8 || 7.9 || 4.5 || 14.7 || align=center|
|-
|align="left"| || align="center"|G || align="left"|Arkansas || align="center"|1 || align="center"| || 12 || 71 || 10 || 7 || 30 || 5.9 || 0.8 || 0.6 || 2.5 || align=center|
|-
|align="left"| || align="center"|G/F || align="left"|Michigan || align="center"|1 || align="center"| || 37 || 886 || 112 || 58 || 524 || 23.9 || 3.0 || 1.6 || 14.2 || align=center|
|-
|align="left"| || align="center"|G/F || align="left"|Indiana || align="center"|2 || align="center"|– || 132 || 2,046 || 297 || 181 || 876 || 15.5 || 2.3 || 1.4 || 6.6 || align=center|
|-
|align="left"| || align="center"|F || align="left"|Wake Forest || align="center"|1 || align="center"| || 42 || 532 || 148 || 18 || 171 || 12.7 || 3.5 || 0.4 || 4.1 || align=center|
|-
|align="left"| || align="center"|F || align="left"|Fresno State || align="center"|1 || align="center"| || 10 || 67 || 18 || 3 || 8 || 6.7 || 1.8 || 0.3 || 0.8 || align=center|
|-
|align="left"| || align="center"|G || align="left"|Northwestern || align="center"|2 || align="center"|– || 154 || 2,575 || 171 || 501 || 1,129 || 16.7 || 1.1 || 3.3 || 7.3 || align=center|
|-
|align="left"| || align="center"|G || align="left"|Kansas || align="center"|5 || align="center"|– || 312 || 7,634 || 770 || 356 || 2,817 || 24.5 || 2.5 || 1.1 || 9.0 || align=center|
|-
|align="left"| || align="center"|G || align="left"|St. John's || align="center"|4 || align="center"|– || 247 || 6,219 || 690 || 785 || 2,118 || 25.2 || 2.8 || 3.2 || 8.6 || align=center|
|-
|align="left"| || align="center"|F/C || align="left"|California || align="center"|1 || align="center"| || 33 || 210 || 57 || 6 || 79 || 6.4 || 1.7 || 0.2 || 2.4 || align=center|
|-
|align="left"| || align="center"|F/C || align="left"|San Francisco || align="center"|2 || align="center"|– || 84 ||  || 101 || 18 || 137 ||  || 1.7 || 0.3 || 1.6 || align=center|
|-
|align="left"| || align="center"|F/C || align="left"|Marquette || align="center"|3 || align="center"|– || 216 || 3,878 || 1,153 || 169 || 1,889 || 18.0 || 5.3 || 0.8 || 8.7 || align=center|
|-
|align="left"| || align="center"|F/C || align="left"|Dayton || align="center"|2 || align="center"| || 136 || 2,040 || 542 || 140 || 816 || 15.0 || 4.0 || 1.0 || 6.0 || align=center|
|-
|align="left"| || align="center"|G || align="left"|Auburn || align="center"|2 || align="center"|– || 90 || 1,650 || 170 || 171 || 845 || 18.3 || 1.9 || 1.9 || 9.4 || align=center|
|-
|align="left"| || align="center"|F/C || align="left"|Southern Illinois || align="center"|5 || align="center"|– || 319 || 6,162 || 1,521 || 236 || 2,122 || 19.3 || 4.8 || 0.7 || 6.7 || align=center|
|-
|align="left"| || align="center"|F || align="left"|Houston || align="center"|1 || align="center"| || 39 || 332 || 113 || 19 || 119 || 8.5 || 2.9 || 0.5 || 3.1 || align=center|
|-
|align="left"| || align="center"|F/C || align="left"|DePaul || align="center"|2 || align="center"|– || 54 ||  || 25 || 30 || 206 ||  || 2.5 || 0.6 || 3.8 || align=center|
|-
|align="left"| || align="center"|G || align="left"|Utah || align="center"|1 || align="center"| || 30 || 622 || 76 || 141 || 172 || 20.7 || 2.5 || 4.7 || 5.7 || align=center|
|-
|align="left" bgcolor="#FFCC00"|+ || align="center"|C || align="left"|Purdue || align="center"|6 || align="center"|– || 385 || 13,283 || 3,305 || 1,542 || 5,117 || 34.5 || 8.6 || 4.0 || 13.3 || align=center|
|-
|align="left"| || align="center"|C || align="left"|Arkansas || align="center"|1 || align="center"| || 4 || 35 || 8 || 0 || 10 || 8.8 || 2.0 || 0.0 || 2.5 || align=center|
|-
|align="left"| || align="center"|F || align="left"|Baylor || align="center"|1 || align="center"| || 6 || 61 || 12 || 3 || 17 || 10.2 || 2.0 || 0.5 || 2.8 || align=center|
|-
|align="left"| || align="center"|G || align="left"|Rhode Island || align="center"|1 || align="center"| || 43 || 1,662 || 166 || 146 || 765 || 38.7 || 3.9 || 3.4 || 17.8 || align=center|
|-
|align="left"| || align="center"|F || align="left"|Russia || align="center"|1 || align="center"| || 3 || 7 || 1 || 0 || 2 || 2.3 || 0.3 || 0.0 || 0.7 || align=center|
|-
|align="left"| || align="center"|F/C || align="left"|Nebraska || align="center"|2 || align="center"|– || 128 || 3,131 || 646 || 112 || 858 || 24.5 || 5.0 || 0.9 || 6.7 || align=center|
|-
|align="left"| || align="center"|F/C || align="left"|UTPA || align="center"|1 || align="center"| || 65 || 633 || 200 || 47 || 211 || 9.7 || 3.1 || 0.7 || 3.2 || align=center|
|-
|align="left"| || align="center"|F/C || align="left"|Oregon State || align="center"|2 || align="center"|– || 11 || 50 || 12 || 1 || 10 || 4.5 || 1.1 || 0.1 || 0.9 || align=center|
|}

N to P

|-
|align="left"| || align="center"|F || align="left"|NYU || align="center"|1 || align="center"| || 6 || 59 || 19 || 3 || 20 || 9.8 || 3.2 || 0.5 || 3.3 || align=center|
|-
|align="left"| || align="center"|F || align="left"|Hawaii || align="center"|2 || align="center"|– || 148 || 2,107 || 375 || 117 || 887 || 14.2 || 2.5 || 0.8 || 6.0 || align=center|
|-
|align="left"| || align="center"|G || align="left"|Louisiana-Monroe || align="center"|1 || align="center"| || 4 || 16 || 1 || 3 || 0 || 4.0 || 0.3 || 0.8 || 0.0 || align=center|
|-
|align="left"| || align="center"|C || align="left"|Rutgers || align="center"|1 || align="center"| || 14 || 74 || 18 || 3 || 6 || 5.3 || 1.3 || 0.2 || 0.4 || align=center|
|-
|align="left"| || align="center"|F || align="left"|Kansas State || align="center"|3 || align="center"|– || 175 || 2,828 || 751 || 130 || 600 || 16.2 || 4.3 || 0.7 || 3.4 || align=center|
|-
|align="left"| || align="center"|G || align="left"|Washington || align="center"|1 || align="center"| || 8 || 53 || 3 || 5 || 15 || 6.6 || 0.4 || 0.6 || 1.9 || align=center|
|-
|align="left"| || align="center"|C || align="left"|Duke || align="center"|1 || align="center"| || 9 || 41 || 9 || 0 || 5 || 4.6 || 1.0 || 0.0 || 0.6 || align=center|
|-
|align="left"| || align="center"|F || align="left"|Argentina || align="center"|2 || align="center"|– || 98 || 2,190 || 361 || 117 || 951 || 22.3 || 3.7 || 1.2 || 9.7 || align=center|
|-
|align="left"| || align="center"|F || align="left"|Kentucky || align="center"|2 || align="center"|– || 60 || 32 || 85 || 37 || 136 || 4.0 || 1.4 || 0.6 || 2.3 || align=center|
|-
|align="left"| || align="center"|C || align="left"|Saint Louis || align="center"|1 || align="center"| || 58 || 344 || 128 || 18 || 131 || 5.9 || 2.2 || 0.3 || 2.3 || align=center|
|-
|align="left"| || align="center"|F/C || align="left"|Loyola (IL) || align="center"|2 || align="center"|– || 65 ||  ||  || 116 || 323 ||  ||  || 1.8 || 5.0 || align=center|
|-
|align="left"| || align="center"|F || align="left"|Minnesota || align="center"|4 || align="center"|– || 319 || 7,596 || 1,566 || 792 || 2,448 || 23.8 || 4.9 || 2.5 || 7.7 || align=center|
|-
|align="left"| || align="center"|C || align="left"|Seattle || align="center"|1 || align="center"| || 54 || 946 || 304 || 33 || 297 || 17.5 || 5.6 || 0.6 || 5.5 || align=center|
|-
|align="left"| || align="center"|G || align="left"|UConn || align="center"|1 || align="center"| || 7 || 68 || 6 || 3 || 12 || 9.7 || 0.9 || 0.4 || 1.7 || align=center|
|-
|align="left"| || align="center"|F/C || align="left"|Louisville || align="center"|4 || align="center"|– || 184 || 2,294 || 600 || 157 || 914 || 12.5 || 3.3 || 0.9 || 5.0 || align=center|
|-
|align="left"| || align="center"|C || align="left"|Kansas || align="center"|1 || align="center"| || 56 || 556 || 167 || 37 || 87 || 9.9 || 3.0 || 0.7 || 1.6 || align=center|
|-
|align="left"| || align="center"|F || align="left"|Starkville HS (MS) || align="center"|3 || align="center"|– || 140 || 2,009 || 290 || 85 || 710 || 14.4 || 2.1 || 0.6 || 5.1 || align=center|
|-
|align="left"| || align="center"|G/F || align="left"|Syracuse || align="center"|3 || align="center"|– || 166 || 4,937 || 1,099 || 476 || 1,760 || 29.7 || 6.6 || 2.9 || 10.6 || align=center|
|-
|align="left"| || align="center"|F/C || align="left"|Dayton || align="center"|2 || align="center"|– || 87 || 2,024 || 583 || 82 || 871 || 23.3 || 6.7 || 0.9 || 10.0 || align=center|
|-
|align="left"| || align="center"|C || align="left"|Greece || align="center"|2 || align="center"|– || 38 || 473 || 122 || 29 || 158 || 12.4 || 3.2 || 0.8 || 4.2 || align=center|
|-
|align="left"| || align="center"|G/F || align="left"|Missouri || align="center"|2 || align="center"|– || 107 || 2,747 || 451 || 294 || 960 || 25.7 || 4.2 || 2.7 || 9.0 || align=center|
|-
|align="left"| || align="center"|C || align="left"|Kansas State || align="center"|1 || align="center"| || 66 || 1,037 || 278 || 51 || 262 || 15.7 || 4.2 || 0.8 || 4.0 || align=center|
|-
|align="left"| || align="center"|F || align="left"|Kentucky || align="center"|2 || align="center"|– || 41 || 971 || 215 || 45 || 311 || 23.7 || 5.2 || 1.1 || 7.6 || align=center|
|-
|align="left"| || align="center"|F/C || align="left"|Northeastern State || align="center"|1 || align="center"| || 68 || 1,213 || 320 || 27 || 627 || 17.8 || 4.7 || 0.4 || 9.2 || align=center|
|-
|align="left"| || align="center"|G || align="left"|Manhattan || align="center"|1 || align="center"| || 6 || 68 || 10 || 4 || 20 || 11.3 || 1.7 || 0.7 || 3.3 || align=center|
|-
|align="left"| || align="center"|G/F || align="left"|Dayton || align="center"|1 || align="center"| || 67 || 1,795 || 350 || 139 || 659 || 26.8 || 5.2 || 2.1 || 9.8 || align=center|
|-
|align="left"| || align="center"|G || align="left"|Missouri || align="center"|1 || align="center"| || 75 || 1,391 || 153 || 120 || 431 || 18.5 || 2.0 || 1.6 || 5.7 || align=center|
|-
|align="left"| || align="center"|C || align="left"|Michigan State || align="center"|1 || align="center"| || 55 || 667 || 169 || 24 || 176 || 12.1 || 3.1 || 0.4 || 3.2 || align=center|
|-
|align="left"| || align="center"|F/C || align="left"|Minnesota || align="center"|1 || align="center"| || 66 || 1,633 || 413 || 81 || 671 || 24.7 || 6.3 || 1.2 || 10.2 || align=center|
|-
|align="left"| || align="center"|G || align="left"|North Carolina || align="center"|1 || align="center"| || 3 || 5 || 0 || 1 || 0 || 1.7 || 0.0 || 0.3 || 0.0 || align=center|
|-
|align="left"| || align="center"|F || align="left"|Villanova || align="center"|2 || align="center"|– || 130 || 2,511 || 531 || 140 || 1,116 || 19.3 || 4.1 || 1.1 || 8.6 || align=center|
|-
|align="left"| || align="center"|F/C || align="left"|Xavier || align="center"|5 || align="center"|– || 314 || 6,033 || 1,427 || 394 || 2,445 || 19.2 || 4.5 || 1.3 || 7.8 || align=center|
|-
|align="left"| || align="center"|C || align="left"|Kansas || align="center"|5 || align="center"|– || 272 || 5,459 || 1,622 || 153 || 1,604 || 20.1 || 6.0 || 0.6 || 5.9 || align=center|
|-
|align="left"| || align="center"|F/C || align="left"|Virginia || align="center"|5 || align="center"|– || 345 || 10,378 || 3,053 || 424 || 3,740 || 30.1 || 8.8 || 1.2 || 10.8 || align=center|
|-
|align="left"| || align="center"|F || align="left"|Norfolk State || align="center"|1 || align="center"| || 22 || 129 || 18 || 5 || 41 || 5.9 || 0.8 || 0.2 || 1.9 || align=center|
|-
|align="left"| || align="center"|C || align="left"|Wright State || align="center"|2 || align="center"|– || 12 || 45 || 4 || 2 || 10 || 3.8 || 0.3 || 0.2 || 0.8 || align=center|
|-
|align="left"| || align="center"|G/F || align="left"|Villanova || align="center"|4 || align="center"|– || 299 || 6,802 || 1,339 || 628 || 2,702 || 22.7 || 4.5 || 2.1 || 9.0 || align=center|
|-
|align="left"| || align="center"|G || align="left"|Oklahoma || align="center"|1 || align="center"| || 20 || 89 || 8 || 9 || 31 || 4.5 || 0.4 || 0.5 || 1.6 || align=center|
|-
|align="left"| || align="center"|G || align="left"|Utah Valley || align="center"|2 || align="center"|– || 87 || 713 || 86 || 59 || 252 || 8.2 || 1.0 || 0.7 || 2.9 || align=center|
|}

R

|-
|align="left"| || align="center"|C || align="left"|Xavier || align="center"|1 || align="center"| || 66 || 1,256 || 378 || 56 || 504 || 19.0 || 5.7 || 0.8 || 7.6 || align=center|
|-
|align="left"| || align="center"|F || align="left"|Northwestern || align="center"|1 || align="center"| || 51 || 337 || 76 || 31 || 68 || 6.6 || 1.5 || 0.6 || 1.3 || align=center|
|-
|align="left"| || align="center"|F || align="left"|Santa Clara || align="center"|1 || align="center"| || 67 || 781 || 221 || 52 || 168 || 11.7 || 3.3 || 0.8 || 2.5 || align=center|
|-
|align="left"| || align="center"|F/C || align="left"|Michigan State || align="center"|1 || align="center"| || 59 || 1,508 || 397 || 127 || 857 || 25.6 || 6.7 || 2.2 || 14.5 || align=center|
|-
|align="left"| || align="center"|G || align="left"|NC State || align="center"|1 || align="center"| || 39 || 234 || 39 || 25 || 86 || 6.0 || 1.0 || 0.6 || 2.2 || align=center|
|-
|align="left"| || align="center"|C || align="left"|Wisconsin-Eau Claire || align="center"|2 || align="center"|– || 60 || 685 || 194 || 38 || 241 || 11.4 || 3.2 || 0.6 || 4.0 || align=center|
|-
|align="left"| || align="center"|F || align="left"|Syracuse || align="center"|1 || align="center"| || 7 || 18 || 9 || 0 || 13 || 2.6 || 1.3 || 0.0 || 1.9 || align=center|
|-
|align="left"| || align="center"|G || align="left"|San Francisco || align="center"|2 || align="center"|– || 73 || 1,034 || 160 || 76 || 497 || 14.2 || 2.2 || 1.0 || 6.8 || align=center|
|-
|align="left"| || align="center"|F/C || align="left"|Oklahoma City || align="center"|4 || align="center"|– || 304 || 5,764 || 1,817 || 274 || 2,007 || 19.0 || 6.0 || 0.9 || 6.6 || align=center|
|-
|align="left" bgcolor="#FFCC00"|+ || align="center"|G || align="left"|Seton Hall || align="center"|3 || align="center"|– || 215 || 5,494 || 554 || 629 || 1,785 || 25.6 || 2.6 || 2.9 || 8.3 || align=center|
|-
|align="left"| || align="center"|F/C || align="left"|San Francisco || align="center"|1 || align="center"| || 46 || 463 || 94 || 21 || 127 || 10.1 || 2.0 || 0.5 || 2.8 || align=center|
|-
|align="left"| || align="center"|G || align="left"|Syracuse || align="center"|2 || align="center"|– || 47 || 517 || 56 || 24 || 166 || 11.0 || 1.2 || 0.5 || 3.5 || align=center|
|-
|align="left" bgcolor="#FFFF99"|^ (#2) || align="center"|G || align="left"|Kansas State || align="center"|7 || align="center"|– || 517 || 19,532 || 1,933 || 2,128 || 12,070 || 37.8 || 3.7 || 4.1 || 23.3 || align=center|
|-
|align="left"| || align="center"|F/C || align="left"|Duquesne || align="center"|3 || align="center"|– || 183 || 4,900 || 1,141 || 365 || 1,731 || 26.8 || 6.2 || 2.0 || 9.5 || align=center|
|-
|align="left"| || align="center"|F || align="left"|USC || align="center"|2 || align="center"|– || 86 || 1,804 || 563 || 84 || 687 || 21.0 || 6.5 || 1.0 || 8.0 || align=center|
|-
|align="left" bgcolor="#FFFF99"|^ || align="center"|F/C || align="left"|Ohio State || align="center"|7 || align="center"|– || 463 || 9,039 || 3,812 || 867 || 6,359 || 32.9 || 11.2 || 1.9 || 13.7 || align=center|
|-
|align="left"| || align="center"|F/C || align="left"|Cincinnati || align="center"|1 || align="center"| || 74 || 709 || 233 || 53 || 188 || 9.6 || 3.1 || 0.7 || 2.5 || align=center|
|-
|align="left" bgcolor="#FFFF99"|^ (#14) || align="center"|G/F || align="left"|Cincinnati || align="center"|10 || align="center"|– || 752 || bgcolor="#CFECEC"|33,088 || 6,380 || bgcolor="#CFECEC"|77,31 || bgcolor="#CFECEC"|22,009 || bgcolor="#CFECEC"|44.0 || 8.5 || 10.3 || bgcolor="#CFECEC"|29.3 || align=center|
|-
|align="left"| || align="center"|G || align="left"|Kansas || align="center"|1 || align="center"| || 1 || 25 || 0 || 0 || 5 || 25.0 || 0.0 || 0.0 || 5.0 || align=center|
|-
|align="left"| || align="center"|G || align="left"|Western Kentucky || align="center"|1 || align="center"| || 19 || 271 || 33 || 29 || 108 || 14.3 || 1.7 || 1.5 || 5.7 || align=center|
|-
|align="left"| || align="center"|F || align="left"|USC || align="center"|1 || align="center"| || 38 || 1,229 || 322 || 71 || 769 || 32.3 || 8.5 || 1.9 || 20.2 || align=center|
|-
|align="left"| || align="center"|G || align="left"|Wyoming || align="center"|3 || align="center"|– || 149 || 2,524 || 280 || 253 || 1,620 || 16.9 || 1.9 || 1.7 || 10.9 || align=center|
|-
|align="left"| || align="center"|F || align="left"|Kansas || align="center"|1 || align="center"| || 51 || 809 || 238 || 36 || 247 || 15.9 || 4.7 || 0.7 || 4.8 || align=center|
|-
|align="left"| || align="center"|F || align="left"|DePaul || align="center"|5 || align="center"|– || 395 || 8,765 || 2,532 || 393 || 4,215 || 22.2 || 6.4 || 1.0 || 10.7 || align=center|
|-
|align="left"| || align="center"|F/C || align="left"|Kansas || align="center"|1 || align="center"| || 8 || 162 || 29 || 6 || 47 || 20.3 || 3.6 || 0.8 || 5.9 || align=center|
|-
|align="left" bgcolor="#FFFF99"|^ || align="center"|G || align="left"|Temple || align="center"|1 || align="center"| || 75 || 1,417 || 136 || 352 || 362 || 18.9 || 1.8 || 4.7 || 4.8 || align=center|
|-
|align="left"| || align="center"|G || align="left"|Spain || align="center"|1 || align="center"| || 39 || 517 || 50 || 121 || 234 || 13.3 || 1.3 || 3.1 || 6.0 || align=center|
|-
|align="left"| || align="center"|F/C || align="left"|UC Irvine || align="center"|1 || align="center"| || 45 || 468 || 77 || 26 || 189 || 10.4 || 1.7 || 0.6 || 4.2 || align=center|
|-
|align="left"| || align="center"|G || align="left"|Louisville || align="center"|3 || align="center"|– || 107 || 1,761 || 276 || 302 || 561 || 16.5 || 2.6 || 2.8 || 5.2 || align=center|
|-
|align="left"| || align="center"|G || align="left"|Kentucky || align="center"|1 || align="center"| || 72 || 2,537 || 435 || 839 || 859 || 35.2 || 6.0 || bgcolor="#CFECEC"|11.7 || 11.9 || align=center|
|}

S

|-
|align="left"| || align="center"|G || align="left"|Miami (FL) || align="center"|6 || align="center"|–– || 353 || 10,605 || 1,221 || 1,021 || 3,777 || 30.0 || 3.5 || 2.9 || 10.7 || align=center|
|-
|align="left"| || align="center"|C || align="left"|North Carolina || align="center"|2 || align="center"|– || 39 || 241 || 45 || 13 || 42 || 6.2 || 1.2 || 0.3 || 1.1 || align=center|
|-
|align="left"| || align="center"|G/F || align="left"|St. John's || align="center"|1 || align="center"| || 22 || 344 || 78 || 9 || 103 || 15.6 || 3.5 || 0.4 || 4.7 || align=center|
|-
|align="left"| || align="center"|F/C || align="left"|California || align="center"|1 || align="center"| || 12 || 39 || 18 || 5 || 10 || 3.3 || 1.5 || 0.4 || 0.8 || align=center|
|-
|align="left" bgcolor="#FFFF99"|^ || align="center"|F/C || align="left"|Virginia || align="center"|2 || align="center"|– || 51 || 765 || 195 || 45 || 183 || 15.0 || 3.8 || 0.9 || 3.6 || align=center|
|-
|align="left"| || align="center"|G/F || align="left"|Southern || align="center"|1 || align="center"| || 23 || 186 || 21 || 17 || 88 || 8.1 || 0.9 || 0.7 || 3.8 || align=center|
|-
|align="left"| || align="center"|G/F || align="left"|Seton Hall || align="center"|2 || align="center"|– || 114 ||  || 84 || 96 || 464 ||  || 1.3 || 0.8 || 4.1 || align=center|
|-
|align="left"| || align="center"|G || align="left"|Wisconsin-Eau Claire || align="center"|1 || align="center"| || 9 || 76 || 6 || 10 || 10 || 8.4 || 0.7 || 1.1 || 1.1 || align=center|
|-
|align="left"| || align="center"|F/C || align="left"|Purdue || align="center"|1 || align="center"| || 4 || 15 || 3 || 0 || 9 || 3.8 || 0.8 || 0.0 || 2.3 || align=center|
|-
|align="left"| || align="center"|C || align="left"|Florida || align="center"|1 || align="center"| || 33 || 400 || 118 || 20 || 110 || 12.1 || 3.6 || 0.6 || 3.3 || align=center|
|-
|align="left"| || align="center"|G || align="left"|Nevada || align="center"|1 || align="center"| || 36 || 642 || 69 || 96 || 196 || 17.8 || 1.9 || 2.7 || 5.4 || align=center|
|-
|align="left"| || align="center"|G || align="left"|Georgia Tech || align="center"|1 || align="center"| || 42 || 1,099 || 129 || 91 || 374 || 26.2 || 3.1 || 2.2 || 8.9 || align=center|
|-
|align="left"| || align="center"|F || align="left"|Kentucky State || align="center"|1 || align="center"| || 5 || 26 || 4 || 0 || 12 || 5.2 || 0.8 || 0.0 || 2.4 || align=center|
|-
|align="left"| || align="center"|F || align="left"|NC State || align="center"|1 || align="center"| || 7 || 23 || 4 || 0 || 1 || 3.3 || 0.6 || 0.0 || 0.1 || align=center|
|-
|align="left"| || align="center"|F/C || align="left"|Flushing HS (NY) || align="center"|1 || align="center"| || 68 || 903 || 235 || 82 || 366 || 13.3 || 3.5 || 1.2 || 5.4 || align=center|
|-
|align="left"| || align="center"|F || align="left"|La Salle || align="center"|7 || align="center"|– || 454 || 13,472 || 2,833 || 1,498 || 5,833 || 29.7 || 6.2 || 3.3 || 12.8 || align=center|
|-
|align="left"| || align="center"|F || align="left"|Kent State || align="center"|1 || align="center"| || 4 || 12 || 4 || 0 || 4 || 3.0 || 1.0 || 0.0 || 1.0 || align=center|
|-
|align="left"| || align="center"|F || align="left"|Baylor || align="center"|2 || align="center"|– || 63 || 1,124 || 319 || 55 || 272 || 17.8 || 5.1 || 0.9 || 4.3 || align=center|
|-
|align="left" bgcolor="#FFCC00"|+ || align="center"|G || align="left"|Kentucky || align="center"|9 || align="center"|– || 653 || 17,443 || 1,507 || 1,580 || 8,085 || 26.7 || 2.3 || 2.4 || 12.4 || align=center|
|-
|align="left"| || align="center"|G/F || align="left"|Louisville || align="center"|3 || align="center"|– || 116 || 3,157 || 366 || 353 || 1,595 || 27.2 || 3.2 || 3.0 || 13.8 || align=center|
|-
|align="left"| || align="center"|C || align="left"|LSU || align="center"|3 || align="center"|– || 52 || 305 || 53 || 23 || 108 || 5.9 || 1.0 || 0.4 || 2.1 || align=center|
|-
|align="left"| || align="center"|G || align="left"|North Carolina || align="center"|3 || align="center"|– || 188 || 7,062 || 484 || 1,358 || 2,932 || 37.6 || 2.6 || 7.2 || 15.6 || align=center|
|-
|align="left"| || align="center"|G || align="left"|Louisville || align="center"|1 || align="center"| || 59 || 829 || 76 || 104 || 301 || 14.1 || 1.3 || 1.8 || 5.1 || align=center|
|-
|align="left"| || align="center"|F || align="left"|Providence || align="center"|4 || align="center"|– || 246 || 5,993 || 1,744 || 397 || 1,525 || 24.4 || 7.1 || 1.6 || 6.2 || align=center|
|-
|align="left"| || align="center"|G || align="left"|Clemson || align="center"|1 || align="center"| || 14 || 168 || 21 || 10 || 70 || 12.0 || 1.5 || 0.7 || 5.0 || align=center|
|-
|align="left"| || align="center"|F || align="left"|Wake Forest || align="center"|2 || align="center"|– || 154 || 2,644 || 569 || 162 || 945 || 17.2 || 3.7 || 1.1 || 6.1 || align=center|
|-
|align="left"| || align="center"|G || align="left"|Villanova || align="center"|1 || align="center"| || 80 || 2,375 || 186 || 362 || 831 || 29.7 || 2.3 || 4.5 || 10.4 || align=center|
|-
|align="left"| || align="center"|G || align="left"|Western Kentucky || align="center"|4 || align="center"|– || 271 || 6,608 || 1,163 || 533 || 2,384 || 24.4 || 4.3 || 2.0 || 8.8 || align=center|
|-
|align="left"| || align="center"|F || align="left"|Northern Arizona || align="center"|1 || align="center"| || 23 || 286 || 61 || 19 || 138 || 12.4 || 2.7 || 0.8 || 6.0 || align=center|
|-
|align="left"| || align="center"|C || align="left"|Western Kentucky || align="center"|3 || align="center"|– || 211 || 3,943 || 941 || 209 || 1,563 || 18.7 || 4.5 || 1.0 || 7.4 || align=center|
|-
|align="left"| || align="center"|G || align="left"|Michigan || align="center"|1 || align="center"| || 73 || 1,127 || 88 || 67 || 319 || 15.4 || 1.2 || 0.9 || 4.4 || align=center|
|-
|align="left"| || align="center"|F || align="left"|Thomas More || align="center"|4 || align="center"|– || 206 || 2,424 || 779 || 194 || 870 || 11.8 || 3.8 || 0.9 || 4.2 || align=center|
|-
|align="left"| || align="center"|G/F || align="left"|Georgia Tech || align="center"|2 || align="center"| || 96 || 1,271 || 134 || 149 || 511 || 13.2 || 1.4 || 1.6 || 5.3 || align=center|
|-
|align="left"| || align="center"|F || align="left"|Cincinnati || align="center"|1 || align="center"| || 8 || 49 || 16 || 4 || 13 || 6.1 || 2.0 || 0.5 || 1.6 || align=center|
|-
|align="left"| || align="center"|C || align="left"|California || align="center"|1 || align="center"| || 81 || 1,761 || 536 || 61 || 375 || 21.7 || 6.6 || 0.8 || 4.6 || align=center|
|-
|align="left"| || align="center"|G || align="left"|Gonzaga || align="center"|1 || align="center"| || 3 || 33 || 2 || 9 || 8 || 11.0 || 0.7 || 3.0 || 2.7 || align=center|
|-
|align="left" bgcolor="#FFCC00"|+ (#16) || align="center"|G/F || align="left"|Serbia || align="center"|8 || align="center"|– || 518 || 17,723 || 2,581 || 1,037 || 9,498 || 34.2 || 5.0 || 2.0 || 18.3 || align=center|
|-
|align="left"| || align="center"|F/C || align="left"|Iowa || align="center"|1 || align="center"| || 11 || 34 || 5 || 0 || 4 || 3.1 || 0.5 || 0.0 || 0.4 || align=center|
|-
|align="left" bgcolor="#FFFF99"|^ (#12) || align="center"|F/C || align="left"|Saint Francis (PA) || align="center"|3 || align="center"|– || 202 || 7,544 || 3,492 || 1,062 || 3,315 || 37.3 || 17.3 || 5.3 || 16.4 || align=center|
|-
|align="left"| || align="center"|G || align="left"|Pepperdine || align="center"|2 || align="center"|– || 46 || 493 || 49 || 48 || 272 || 10.7 || 1.1 || 1.0 || 5.9 || align=center|
|-
|align="left" bgcolor="#CCFFCC"|x || align="center"|F || align="left"|Purdue || align="center"|1 || align="center"| || 3 || 33 || 12 || 4 || 8 || 11.0 || 4.0 || 1.3 || 2.7 || align=center|
|-
|align="left"| || align="center"|F || align="left"|Detroit Mercy || align="center"|1 || align="center"| || 63 || 611 || 110 || 33 || 100 || 9.7 || 1.7 || 0.5 || 1.6 || align=center|
|}

T

|-
|align="left"| || align="center"|G || align="left"|Princeton || align="center"|1 || align="center"| || 72 || 2,488 || 238 || 320 || 1,227 || 34.6 || 3.3 || 4.4 || 17.0 || align=center|
|-
|align="left"| || align="center"|G/F || align="left"|UTPA || align="center"|1 || align="center"| || 21 || 214 || 37 || 11 || 71 || 10.2 || 1.8 || 0.5 || 3.4 || align=center|
|-
|align="left"| || align="center"|G || align="left"|UCF || align="center"|1 || align="center"| || 26 || 406 || 53 || 30 || 184 || 15.6 || 2.0 || 1.2 || 7.1 || align=center|
|-
|align="left"| || align="center"|F || align="left"|Michigan || align="center"|1 || align="center"| || 12 || 103 || 28 || 5 || 24 || 8.6 || 2.3 || 0.4 || 2.0 || align=center|
|-
|align="left"| || align="center"|G || align="left"|LSU || align="center"|3 || align="center"|– || 135 || 3,366 || 339 || 294 || 1,064 || 24.9 || 2.5 || 2.2 || 7.9 || align=center|
|-
|align="left"| || align="center"|G/F || align="left"|Cincinnati || align="center"|3 || align="center"|– || 153 || 1,405 || 361 || 153 || 450 || 9.2 || 2.4 || 1.0 || 2.9 || align=center|
|-
|align="left"| || align="center"|G || align="left"|UNLV || align="center"|5 || align="center"|– || 346 || 11,884 || 1,155 || 2,809 || 6,492 || 34.3 || 3.3 || 8.1 || 18.8 || align=center|
|-
|align="left"| || align="center"|G || align="left"|Weber State || align="center"|1 || align="center"| || 1 || 2 || 1 || 0 || 2 || 2.0 || 1.0 || 0.0 || 2.0 || align=center|
|-
|align="left"| || align="center"|G || align="left"|Eastern Michigan || align="center"|1 || align="center"| || 1 || 31 || 0 || 1 || 12 || 31.0 || 0.0 || 1.0 || 12.0 || align=center|
|-
|align="left"| || align="center"|G || align="left"|Washington || align="center"|3 || align="center"|– || 216 || 6,275 || 539 || 1,036 || 3,314 || 29.1 || 2.5 || 4.8 || 15.3 || align=center|
|-
|align="left"| || align="center"|F || align="left"|New Mexico || align="center"|6 || align="center"|– || 227 || 5,184 || 1,384 || 348 || 1,536 || 22.8 || 6.1 || 1.5 || 6.8 || align=center|
|-
|align="left"| || align="center"|F/C || align="left"|Rider || align="center"|7 || align="center"|– || 541 || 14,348 || 3,746 || 606 || 5,063 || 26.5 || 6.9 || 1.1 || 9.4 || align=center|
|-
|align="left"| || align="center"|F/C || align="left"|Texas || align="center"|7 || align="center"|– || 507 || 12,436 || 4,214 || 651 || 5,306 || 24.5 || 8.3 || 1.3 || 10.5 || align=center|
|-
|align="left"| || align="center"|G || align="left"|Syracuse || align="center"|1 || align="center"| || 18 || 76 || 18 || 7 || 29 || 4.2 || 1.0 || 0.4 || 1.6 || align=center|
|-
|align="left"| || align="center"|G || align="left"|LSU || align="center"|4 || align="center"|– || 196 || 5,657 || 620 || 328 || 2,825 || 28.9 || 3.2 || 1.7 || 14.4 || align=center|
|-
|align="left"| || align="center"|F/C || align="left"|Providence || align="center"|5 || align="center"|– || 348 || 10,244 || 2,798 || 723 || 5,269 || 29.4 || 8.0 || 2.1 || 15.1 || align=center|
|-
|align="left"| || align="center"|G || align="left"|Thomas More || align="center"|1 || align="center"| || 29 || 176 || 22 || 27 || 34 || 6.1 || 0.8 || 0.9 || 1.2 || align=center|
|-
|align="left"| || align="center"|F/C || align="left"|Oklahoma || align="center"|6 || align="center"|– || 370 || 12,522 || 2,676 || 580 || 6,808 || 33.8 || 7.2 || 1.6 || 18.4 || align=center|
|-
|align="left"| || align="center"|F/C || align="left"|Creighton || align="center"|1 || align="center"| || 65 || 1,477 || 237 || 77 || 461 || 22.7 || 3.6 || 1.2 || 7.1 || align=center|
|-
|align="left"| || align="center"|G || align="left"|Dayton || align="center"|1 || align="center"| || 32 || 682 || 46 || 122 || 176 || 21.3 || 1.4 || 3.8 || 5.5 || align=center|
|-
|align="left"| || align="center"|F/C || align="left"|Seattle || align="center"|2 || align="center"|– || 81 || 2,483 || 588 || 149 || 917 || 30.7 || 7.3 || 1.8 || 11.3 || align=center|
|-
|align="left"| || align="center"|F || align="left"|Oklahoma Baptist || align="center"|1 || align="center"| || 28 || 626 || 122 || 19 || 301 || 22.4 || 4.4 || 0.7 || 10.8 || align=center|
|-
|align="left"| || align="center"|F || align="left"|Turkey || align="center"|3 || align="center"|– || 221 || 4,390 || 761 || 319 || 1,648 || 19.9 || 3.4 || 1.4 || 7.5 || align=center|
|-
|align="left"| || align="center"|F || align="left"|Akron || align="center"|1 || align="center"| || 69 || 1,095 || 290 || 42 || 494 || 15.9 || 4.2 || 0.6 || 7.2 || align=center|
|-
|align="left"| || align="center"|G/F || align="left"|Cal State Fullerton || align="center"|2 || align="center"| || 66 || 464 || 78 || 29 || 224 || 7.0 || 1.2 || 0.4 || 3.4 || align=center|
|-
|align="left" bgcolor="#FFFF99"|^ (#27) || align="center"|G/F || align="left"|Cincinnati || align="center"|11 || align="center"|– || 823 || 26,147 || 5,424 || 1,861 || 15,840 || 31.8 || 6.6 || 2.3 || 19.2 || align=center|
|-
|align="left"| || align="center"|G/F || align="left"|Detroit Mercy || align="center"|3 || align="center"|– || 227 || 4,766 || 883 || 223 || 1,844 || 21.0 || 3.9 || 1.0 || 8.1 || align=center|
|}

U to Z

|-
|align="left"| || align="center"|F || align="left"|Portland State || align="center"|1 || align="center"| || 69 || 944 || 191 || 58 || 250 || 13.7 || 2.8 || 0.8 || 3.6 || align=center|
|-
|align="left"| || align="center"|G || align="left"|Slovenia || align="center"|4 || align="center"|– || 296 || 9,561 || 921 || 1,382 || 3,743 || 32.3 || 3.1 || 4.7 || 12.6 || align=center|
|-
|align="left" bgcolor="#FFCC00"|+ || align="center"|G/F || align="left"|Indiana || align="center"|6 || align="center"|– || 379 || 13,311 || 1,934 || 908 || 7,278 || 35.1 || 5.1 || 2.4 || 19.2 || align=center|
|-
|align="left"| || align="center"|G || align="left"|Saint Francis (PA) || align="center"|3 || align="center"|– || 173 || 6,494 || 1,050 || 1,383 || 2,158 || 37.5 || 6.1 || 8.0 || 12.5 || align=center|
|-
|align="left"| || align="center"|G || align="left"|Maryland || align="center"|1 || align="center"| || 18 || 465 || 34 || 95 || 176 || 25.8 || 1.9 || 5.3 || 9.8 || align=center|
|-
|align="left"| || align="center"|F || align="left"|Fresno State || align="center"|1 || align="center"| || 54 || 366 || 63 || 17 || 123 || 6.8 || 1.2 || 0.3 || 2.3 || align=center|
|-
|align="left"| || align="center"|G || align="left"|Providence || align="center"|3 || align="center"|– || 226 || 8,532 || 618 || 705 || 3,925 || 37.8 || 2.7 || 3.1 || 17.4 || align=center|
|-
|align="left"| || align="center"|F || align="left"|Alabama || align="center"|3 || align="center"|– || 138 || 1,338 || 291 || 69 || 468 || 9.7 || 2.1 || 0.5 || 3.4 || align=center|
|-
|align="left"| || align="center"|G || align="left"|Marquette || align="center"|1 || align="center"| || 61 || 821 || 48 || 208 || 206 || 13.5 || 0.8 || 3.4 || 3.4 || align=center|
|-
|align="left" bgcolor="#FFFF99"|^ || align="center"|G || align="left"|Seton Hall || align="center"|9 || align="center"|– || 568 || 12,128 || 1,979 || 1,830 || 6,924 || 32.5 || 4.5 || 3.2 || 12.2 || align=center|
|-
|align="left"| || align="center"|F || align="left"|Oklahoma City || align="center"|1 || align="center"| || 33 || 201 || 69 || 6 || 70 || 6.1 || 2.1 || 0.2 || 2.1 || align=center|
|-
|align="left"| || align="center"|F/C || align="left"|UCLA || align="center"|3 || align="center"|– || 178 || 4,657 || 1,400 || 210 || 2,107 || 26.2 || 7.9 || 1.2 || 11.8 || align=center|
|-
|align="left"| || align="center"|C || align="left"|Syracuse || align="center"|1 || align="center"| || 9 || 71 || 12 || 0 || 12 || 7.9 || 1.3 || 0.0 || 1.3 || align=center|
|-
|align="left"| || align="center"|F || align="left"|UCLA || align="center"|1 || align="center"| || 2 || 7 || 2 || 1 || 0 || 3.5 || 1.0 || 0.5 || 0.0 || align=center|
|-
|align="left"| || align="center"|G || align="left"|NC State || align="center"|4 || align="center"|– || 301 || 10,084 || 812 || 2,024 || 4,114 || 33.5 || 2.7 || 6.7 || 13.7 || align=center|
|-
|align="left" bgcolor="#FFCC00"|+ (#4) || align="center"|F/C || align="left"|Michigan || align="center"|7 || align="center"|– || 377 || 14,627 || 4,006 || 1,791 || 8,843 || 38.8 || 10.6 || 4.8 || 23.5 || align=center|
|-
|align="left" bgcolor="#FFCC00"|+ || align="center"|G/F || align="left"|Colorado || align="center"|7 || align="center"|– || 546 || 18,973 || 3,270 || 1,271 || 9,002 || 34.7 || 6.0 || 2.3 || 16.5 || align=center|
|-
|align="left"| || align="center"|G/F || align="left"|Ball State || align="center"|1 || align="center"| || 52 || 1,684 || 401 || 144 || 707 || 32.4 || 7.7 || 2.8 || 13.6 || align=center|
|-
|align="left"| || align="center"|C || align="left"|St. John's || align="center"|2 || align="center"| || 84 || 1,512 || 359 || 70 || 451 || 18.0 || 4.3 || 0.8 || 5.4 || align=center|
|-
|align="left"| || align="center"|C || align="left"|Kansas || align="center"|3 || align="center"|– || 212 || 3,161 || 1,013 || 100 || 1,390 || 14.9 || 4.8 || 0.5 || 6.6 || align=center|
|-
|align="left" bgcolor="#FFFF99"|^ || align="center"|G || align="left"|Kansas || align="center"|1 || align="center"| || 13 || 236 || 21 || 37 || 83 || 18.2 || 1.6 || 2.8 || 6.4 || align=center|
|-
|align="left"| || align="center"|F || align="left"|Iowa State || align="center"|1 || align="center"| || 3 || 9 || 0 || 0 || 0 || 3.0 || 0.0 || 0.0 || 0.0 || align=center|
|-
|align="left"| || align="center"|C || align="left"|Marshall || align="center"|2 || align="center"|– || 19 || 111 || 39 || 0 || 29 || 5.8 || 2.1 || 0.0 || 1.5 || align=center|
|-
|align="left"| || align="center"|G/F || align="left"|NC State || align="center"|2 || align="center"|– || 70 || 1,048 || 146 || 87 || 404 || 15.0 || 2.1 || 1.2 || 5.8 || align=center|
|-
|align="left"| || align="center"|F || align="left"|Cincinnati || align="center"|1 || align="center"| || 60 || 326 || 112 || 23 || 119 || 5.4 || 1.9 || 0.4 || 2.0 || align=center|
|-
|align="left"| || align="center"|G/F || align="left"|Memphis || align="center"|2 || align="center"|– || 134 || 2,709 || 499 || 352 || 1,011 || 20.2 || 3.7 || 2.6 || 7.5 || align=center|
|-
|align="left"| || align="center"|F || align="left"|Arizona || align="center"|2 || align="center"|– || 141 || 3,120 || 499 || 105 || 1,187 || 22.1 || 3.5 || 0.7 || 8.4 || align=center|
|-
|align="left"| || align="center"|G || align="left"|Florida || align="center"|3 || align="center"|– || 208 || 6,855 || 568 || 1,304 || 2,360 || 33.0 || 2.7 || 6.3 || 11.3 || align=center|
|-
|align="left"| || align="center"|F || align="left"|Wyoming || align="center"|2 || align="center"|– || 48 || 450 || 163 || 2 || 162 || 9.4 || 3.4 || 0.0 || 3.4 || align=center|
|-
|align="left"| || align="center"|F || align="left"|Bradley || align="center"|1 || align="center"| || 16 || 88 || 22 || 2 || 15 || 5.5 || 1.4 || 0.1 || 0.9 || align=center|
|-
|align="left"| || align="center"|G/F || align="left"|Utah State || align="center"|4 || align="center"|– || 293 || 7,796 || 1,234 || 562 || 3,799 || 26.6 || 4.2 || 1.9 || 13.0 || align=center|
|-
|align="left"| || align="center"|G || align="left"|Minnesota || align="center"|1 || align="center"| || 72 || 2,170 || 327 || 569 || 1,109 || 30.1 || 4.5 || 7.9 || 15.4 || align=center|
|-
|align="left"| || align="center"|F || align="left"|Duke || align="center"|2 || align="center"|– || 58 || 667 || 176 || 16 || 258 || 11.5 || 3.0 || 0.3 || 4.4 || align=center|
|-
|align="left"| || align="center"|F || align="left"|Louisville || align="center"|1 || align="center"| || 18 || 369 || 74 || 55 || 159 || 20.5 || 4.1 || 3.1 || 8.8 || align=center|
|-
|align="left"| || align="center"|F || align="left"|Indiana || align="center"|1 || align="center"| || 21 || 312 || 59 || 11 || 111 || 14.9 || 2.8 || 0.5 || 5.3 || align=center|
|-
|align="left"| || align="center"|G/F || align="left"|Maryland || align="center"|4 || align="center"|– || 238 || 7,149 || 1,052 || 791 || 3,556 || 30.0 || 4.4 || 3.3 || 14.9 || align=center|
|-
|align="left"| || align="center"|F || align="left"|Florida State || align="center"|1 || align="center"| || 9 || 49 || 13 || 6 || 8 || 5.4 || 1.4 || 0.7 || 0.9 || align=center|
|-
|align="left"| || align="center"|F || align="left"|Arkansas || align="center"|8 || align="center"|–– || 466 || 10,671 || 1,751 || 613 || 5,026 || 22.9 || 3.8 || 1.3 || 10.8 || align=center|
|-
|align="left"| || align="center"|C || align="left"|Cincinnati || align="center"|3 || align="center"|– || 98 || 689 || 243 || 28 || 255 || 7.0 || 2.5 || 0.3 || 2.6 || align=center|
|-
|align="left"| || align="center"|G || align="left"|Virginia || align="center"|1 || align="center"| || 53 || 789 || 81 || 207 || 210 || 14.9 || 1.5 || 3.9 || 4.0 || align=center|
|-
|align="left"| || align="center"|F || align="left"|UCLA || align="center"|2 || align="center"|– || 67 || 1,242 || 271 || 72 || 462 || 18.5 || 4.0 || 1.1 || 6.9 || align=center|
|-
|align="left"| || align="center"|G || align="left"|North Texas || align="center"|1 || align="center"| || 22 || 214 || 24 || 19 || 73 || 9.7 || 1.1 || 0.9 || 3.3 || align=center|
|-
|align="left"| || align="center"|G/F || align="left"|Indiana || align="center"|1 || align="center"| || 31 || 416 || 26 || 32 || 118 || 13.4 || 0.8 || 1.0 || 3.8 || align=center|
|-
|align="left"| || align="center"|G || align="left"|Cal State Fullerton || align="center"|1 || align="center"| || 12 || 222 || 19 || 49 || 81 || 18.5 || 1.6 || 4.1 || 6.8 || align=center|
|-
|align="left"| || align="center"|G/F || align="left"|Indiana || align="center"|5 || align="center"|– || 387 || 10,865 || 1,081 || 975 || 6,314 || 28.1 || 2.8 || 2.5 || 16.3 || align=center|
|-
|align="left"| || align="center"|G/F || align="left"|Texas A&M || align="center"|1 || align="center"| || 7 || 31 || 3 || 0 || 2 || 4.4 || 0.4 || 0.0 || 0.3 || align=center|
|-
|align="left"| || align="center"|F/C || align="left"|Memphis || align="center"|1 || align="center"| || 5 || 13 || 1 || 1 || 2 || 2.6 || 0.2 || 0.2 || 0.4 || align=center|
|-
|align="left"| || align="center"|G || align="left"|Miami (OH) || align="center"|1 || align="center"| || 61 || 278 || 27 || 58 || 90 || 4.6 || 0.4 || 1.0 || 1.5 || align=center|
|}

External links
Sacramento Kings all-time roster

References

National Basketball Association all-time rosters

roster